= MDH =

MDH may refer to:

== Chemistry ==
- Malate dehydrogenase
- (S)-mandelate dehydrogenase
- Methanol dehydrogenase (cytochrome c)
- Methylenedioxyhydroxyamphetamine

== Health and medicine ==
- Manila Doctors Hospital, in Ermita, Manila, Philippines
- Mater Dei Hospital, in Msida, Malta
- Milton District Hospital, in Milton, Ontario, Canada
- Minnesota Department of Health

== Other uses ==
- MDH (spice company), an Indian spice producer and seller
- Maguindanao language (ISO 639-3: mdh)
- Mayotte Division Honneur, association football league in Mayotte, France
- Mälardalen University College (Mälardalens högskola; MdH), in Sweden
- Minimum descent height, for aircraft landing; see List of aviation, avionics, aerospace and aeronautical abbreviations
- Multidimensional hierarchical toolkit
- Southern Illinois Airport (IATA: MDH)
