= Channel scan =

A channel scan may refer to:

- channel memory
- channel surfing
