= List of toolkits =

A toolkit is an assembly of tools, or a set of basic building units for user interfaces.

The word toolkit may refer to:

- Abstract Window Toolkit
- Accessibility Toolkit
- Adventure Game Toolkit
- B-Toolkit
- Cheminformatics toolkits
- Dojo Toolkit
- Fox toolkit
- GTK, the GIMP Toolkit
- Google Web Toolkit (GWT)
- Harmony (toolkit), an incomplete set of software widgets
- Helsinki Finite-State Technology (HFST)
- Insight Segmentation and Registration Toolkit
- IT Mill Toolkit
- Molecular Modelling Toolkit
- Multidimensional hierarchical toolkit
- Sun Java Wireless Toolkit
- OCR SDK, OCR Toolkit
- OpenGL Utility Toolkit (GLUT)
- Open Inventor 3D graphics API
- Qt
- Motif
- Natural Language Toolkit
- Portable, Extensible Toolkit for Scientific Computation
- Scedu Tender Readiness Toolkit
- Standard Widget Toolkit (SWT)
- Synthesis Toolkit
- Template Toolkit
- The Coroner's Toolkit, computer programs for digital forensic analysis
- User Interface Toolkit (UIM)
- X Toolkit Intrinsics

== See also ==
- The dictionary definition of toolkit at Wiktionary
- Widget toolkit
- List of widget toolkits
