= Screen hotspot =

Area enabled for user interactivity on a display

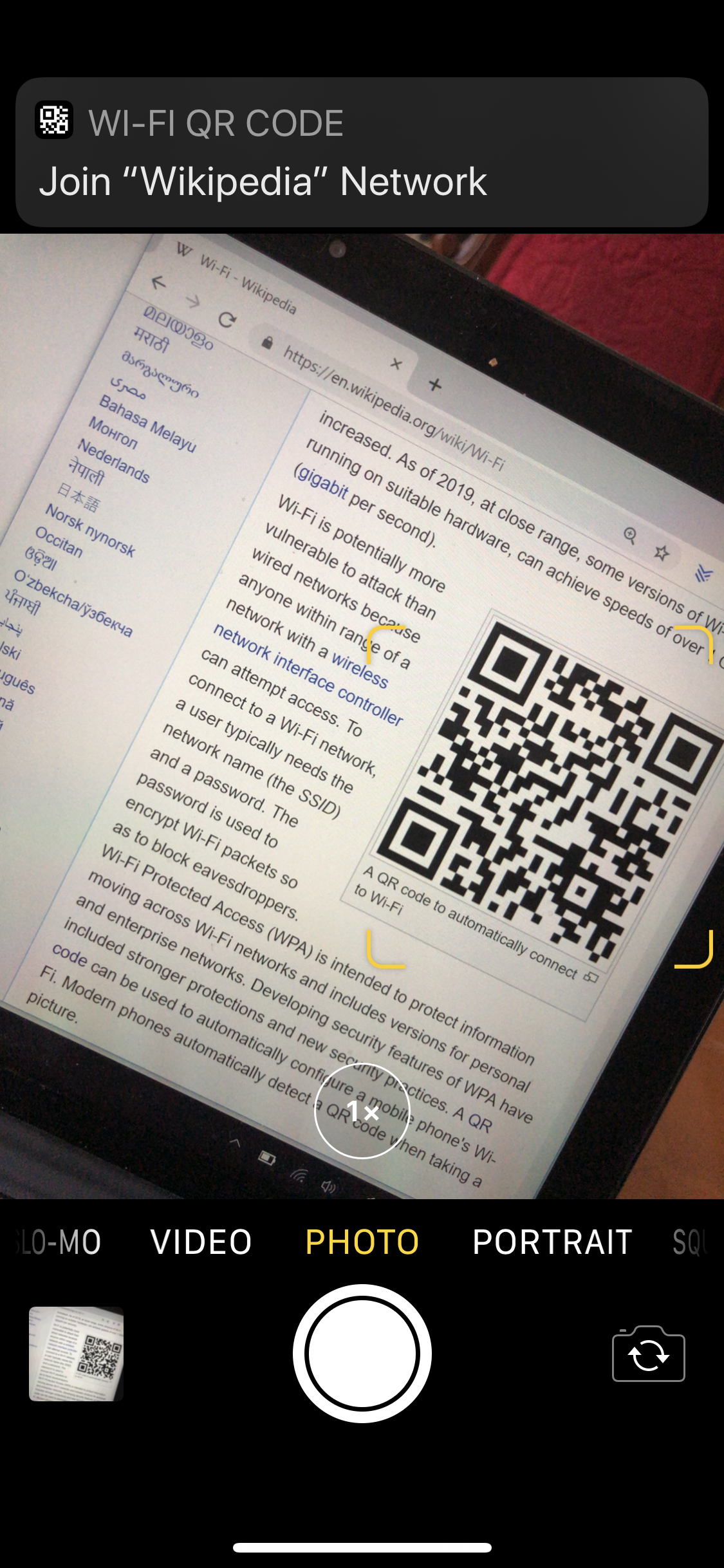
A pop-up in the top of the screen after the camera recognizes a QR code

A screen hotspot, in computing, provides a special area on the display screen of a computer for hyperlinking or for other GUI-based activity (such as re-direction, pop-up display, macro execution, etc.).

Hotspots may not look visually distinct; however, a mouseover operation over elements such as hyperlinks, buttons or idle windows will often reveal them by changing the shape of the pointer.

The corners and edges of the whole screen may also act as hotspots. Some screen savers under MS-DOS and older versions of Windows can be configured to be activated immediately (that is, without waiting for some period of inactivity to time out) or to never activate the screen saver mode at all (even after timeout) when the mouse is moved into a particular (often configurable) corner of the screen. Hotspots are used extensively in Windows 8, where they are referred to as "hot corners".

According to Fitts's law, which predicts the time it takes to reach a target area, moving mouse and trackball pointers to those spots is easy and fast. As the pointer usually stops when reaching a screen edge, the size of those spots can be considered of virtual infinite size, so the hot corners and edges can be reached quickly by throwing the pointer toward the edges.

== See also ==
- Context menu
- Image map
