= Paul Fitts =

American psychologist

- Born: Paul Morris Fitts Jr. May 6, 1912; Martin, Tennessee, U.S.
- Died: May 2, 1965 (aged 52); Ann Arbor, Michigan, U.S.
- Education: Brown University; University of Rochester
- Known for: Fitts's law
- Scientific career
- Workplaces: Ohio State University; University of Michigan

Paul Morris Fitts Jr. (May 6, 1912 – May 2, 1965) was an American psychologist. He is known for his work at the Ohio State University, where he conducted research in conjunction with personnel at Wright-Patterson Air Force Base, generally recognized as the "birthplace of human factors engineering." Fitts also later taught at the University of Michigan. He developed a model of human movement, Fitts's law, based on rapid, aimed movement, which went on to become one of the most highly successful and well studied mathematical models of human motion.

== Early life and career ==
During his time as a lieutenant colonel in the US Air Force, Fitts had improved aviation safety by focusing on human factors in what were called "man-machine operations" in that era. He thus became widely recognized as a pioneer in the emerging multi disciplinary science of human factors engineering.There are also indications Fitts worked in some capacity as a consultant concerning the interview of alleged UFO witnesses, and was planning work on how terrestrial or psychological explanations could account for UFO sightings.

In 1965 he died unexpectedly at the age of 52.

He was President of Division 21 (Division of Applied Experimental and Engineering psychology) of the American Psychological Association (APA), in 1957–1958. The association now has a Paul Fitts honorary award. Fitts was also elected a Fellow in the Human Factors and Ergonomics Society and served as president the organization in 1962-63 (when it was simply named the Human Factors Society).

== Education ==
He received degrees in psychology at the following universities:

- University of Tennessee (BS 1934)
- Brown University (MS 1936)
- University of Rochester (PhD 1938)

== External ==
- Kuang, Cliff (November 13, 2019). "How the Dumb Design of a WWII Plane Led to the Macintosh". Wired.
- Paul M. Fitts Family Donor Impact https://lsa.umich.edu/psych/alumni/donor-impact/paul-m--fitts-family.html
