= Steering law =

The steering law in human–computer interaction and ergonomics is a predictive model of human movement that describes the time required to navigate, or steer, through a 2-dimensional tunnel. The tunnel can be thought of as a path or trajectory on a plane that has an associated thickness or width, where the width can vary along the tunnel. The goal of a steering task is to navigate from one end of the tunnel to the other as quickly as possible, without touching the boundaries of the tunnel. A real-world example that approximates this task is driving a car down a road that may have twists and turns, where the car must navigate the road as quickly as possible without touching the sides of the road. The steering law predicts both the instantaneous speed at which we may navigate the tunnel, and the total time required to navigate the entire tunnel.

The steering law has been independently discovered and studied three times (Rashevsky, 1959; Drury, 1971; Accot and Zhai, 1997). Its most recent discovery has been within the human–computer interaction community, which has resulted in the most general mathematical formulation of the law.

== The steering law in human–computer interaction ==
Within human–computer interaction, the law was rediscovered by Johnny Accot and Shumin Zhai, who mathematically derived it in a novel way from Fitts's law using integral calculus, experimentally verified it for a class of tasks, and developed the most general mathematical statement of it. Some researchers within this community have sometimes referred to the law as the Accot–Zhai steering law or Accot's law (Accot is pronounced ah-cot in English and ah-koh in French). In this context, the steering law is a predictive model of human movement, concerning the speed and total time with which a user may steer a pointing device (such as a mouse or stylus) through a 2D tunnel presented on a screen (i.e. with a bird's eye view of the tunnel), where the user must travel from one end of the path to the other as quickly as possible, while staying within the confines of the path. One potential practical application of this law is in modelling a user's performance in navigating a hierarchical cascading menu.

Many researchers in human–computer interaction, including Accot himself, find it surprising or even amazing that the steering law model predicts performance as well as it does, given the almost purely mathematical way in which it was derived. Some consider this a testament to the robustness of Fitts's law.

In its general form, the steering law can be expressed as

$$T=a + b \int_{C} \frac{ds}{W(s)}$$

where T is the average time to navigate through the path, C is the path parameterized by s, W(s) is the width of the path at s, and a and b are experimentally fitted constants. In general, the path may have a complicated curvilinear shape (such as a spiral) with variable thickness W(s).

Simpler paths allow for mathematical simplifications of the general form of the law. For example, if the path is a straight tunnel of constant width W, the equation reduces to

$$T=a + b \frac{A}{W}$$

where A is the length of the path. We see, especially in this simplified form, a speed–accuracy tradeoff, somewhat similar to that in Fitts's law.

We can also differentiate both sides of the integral equation with respect to s to obtain the local, or instantaneous, form of the law:

$$\frac{ds}{dT} = \frac{W(s)}{b}$$

which says that the instantaneous speed of the user is proportional to the width of the tunnel. This makes intuitive sense if we consider the analogous task of driving a car down a road: the wider the road, the faster we can drive and still stay on the road, even if there are curves in the road.

== Derivation of the model from Fitts's law ==
This derivation is only meant as a high level sketch. It lacks the illustrations of, and may differ in detail from, the derivation given by Accot and Zhai (1997).

Assume that the time required for goal passing (i.e. passing a pointer through a goal at distance A and of width W, oriented perpendicular to the axis of motion) can be modeled with this form of Fitts's law:

$$T_\text{goal} = b \log_2 \left( \frac{A}{W} + 1 \right)$$

Then, a straight tunnel of length A and constant width W can be approximated as a sequence of N evenly spaced goals, each separated from its neighbours by a distance of A/N. We can let N grow arbitrarily large, making the distance between successive goals become infinitesimal. The total time to navigative through all the goals, and thus through the tunnel, is

T_{straight tunnel}	$= \lim_{N \to \infty} \sum_{i=1}^N b \log_2 \left( \frac{A/N}{W} + 1 \right)$
	$= \lim_{N \to \infty} N b \log_2 \left( \frac{A}{N W} + 1 \right)$
	$= b \lim_{N \to \infty} \frac{\log_2 \left( \frac{A}{N W} + 1 \right)}{1/N}$
	$= b \lim_{N \to \infty} \frac{ \ln \left( \frac{A}{N W} + 1 \right)}{\ln \left( 2 \right) \cdot 1/N}$
	$= \frac{b}{\ln \left( 2 \right)} \lim_{N \to \infty} \frac{ \ln \left( \frac{A}{N W} + 1 \right)}{1/N}$	(applying L'Hôpital's rule ...)
	$= \frac{b}{\ln \left( 2 \right)} \lim_{N \to \infty} \frac{\frac{1}{\left( \frac{A}{N W} + 1 \right)}\frac{A}{W}(-1/N^2)}{-1/N^2}$
	$= \frac{b}{\ln \left( 2 \right)} \cdot \frac{A}{W} \lim_{N \to \infty} \frac{1}{\left( \frac{A}{N W} + 1 \right)}$
	$= \frac{b}{\ln \left( 2 \right)} \cdot \frac{A}{W}$

Note that b is an experimentally fitted constant and let $\tilde{b} := \frac{b}{\ln(2)}$. Therefore, T_{straight tunnel} = $\tilde{b} \cdot \frac{A}{W}$.

Next, consider a curved tunnel of total length A, parameterized by s varying from 0 to A. Let W(s) be the variable width of the tunnel. The tunnel can be approximated as a sequence of N straight tunnels, numbered 1 through N, each located at s_{i} where i = 1 to N, and each of length s_{i+1} − s_{i} and of width W(s_{i}). We can let N grow arbitrarily large, making the length of successive straight tunnels become infinitesimal. The total time to navigative through the curved tunnel is

T_{curved tunnel}	$= \lim_{N \to \infty} \sum_{i=1}^N \tilde{b} \frac{s_{i+1} - s_i}{W(s_i)}$
	$= \tilde{b} \int_0^A \frac{ds}{W(s)}$	(... by the definition of the definite integral)

yielding the general form of the steering law.

== Modeling steering in layers ==
Steering law has been extended to predict movement time for steering in layers of thickness t (Kattinakere et al., 2007). The relation is given by

$$T = a+b\sqrt{(A/W)^2+(A/t)^2}.$$

== See also ==
- Crossing-based interface — any graphical user interface that uses goal crossing tasks as the basic interaction paradigm
