= (S)-mandelate dehydrogenase =

Class of enzymes

Identifiers
- EC no.: 1.1.99.31

Databases
- BRENDA: enzyme data
- ExPASy: NiceZyme view
- KEGG: enzyme entry
- MetaCyc: metabolic pathway
- Rhea: reactions
- PDB structures: RCSB PDB PDBe PDBsum
Search
- PMC: articles
- PubMed: articles
- NCBI: proteins

In enzymology, (S)-mandelate dehydrogenase (EC 1.1.99.31) (MDH), is an enzyme that catalyzes the chemical reaction.

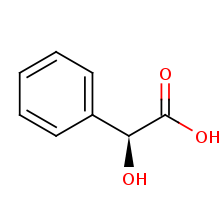
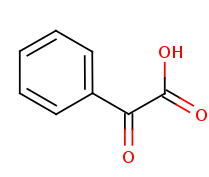
+ acceptor	=	+ reduced acceptor
(S)-Mandelate		2-oxo-2-phenylacetate
(S)-2-hydroxy-2-phenylacetate + acceptor ⇌ 2-oxo-2-phenylacetate + reduced acceptor

Thus, the two substrates of this enzyme are (S)-2-hydroxy-2-phenylacetate and acceptor, whereas its two products are 2-oxo-2-phenylacetate and reduced acceptor.

This enzyme belongs to the family of oxidoreductases, specifically those acting on the CH-OH group of donor with other acceptors. The systematic name of this enzyme class is (S)-2-hydroxy-2-phenylacetate:acceptor 2-oxidoreductase.

This enzyme transfers the electron pair from FMNH2 to a component of the electron transport chain, most probably ubiquinone [1,2]. It is part of a metabolic pathway in Pseudomonads that allows these organisms to utilize mandelic acid, derivatized from the common soil metabolite amygdalin, as the sole source of carbon and energy. The enzyme has a large active-site pocket and preferentially binds substrates with longer sidechains, e.g. 2-hydroxyoctanoate rather than 2-hydroxybutyrate. It also prefers substrates that, like (S)-mandelate, have beta unsaturation, e.g. (indol-3-yl)glycolate compared with (indol-3-yl)lactate. Esters of mandelate, such as methyl (S)-mandelate, are also substrates.

== Synonyms ==
(S)-mandelate dehydrogenase is also known as: L-mandelate dehydrogenase, L-MDH, MDH, SManDH, and SMDH.
