= Channel memory =

An automatic channel memory system (ACMS) is a system in which a digitally controlled radio tuner such as a TV set or VCR could search and memorize TV channels automatically. While more common in television, it can also be used to store presets for radio stations. This is often called a channel scan, though that may also refer to a "preview" mode which plays each station it finds for a few seconds and then moves on to the next, without affecting memory.

== Channel scanning ==
A typical TV device allows an automatic channel scan to be performed from a menu accessed by a button on the TV set, or sometimes only on the remote control. This applied first to analog TV sets — sometimes those with digital LED displays, or later always those with on-screen displays. These simply searched for the video carrier signal on every channel. (Before the advent of ACMS, many sets would search for the next channel every time it was changed.)

It now also applies to digital TV, which must not only find the signal itself, but also decode its metadata enough to remap channel numbers to their proper locations. In the case of the American ATSC system, the ATSC tuner uses PSIP metadata to do this. The internal channel map for digital TV stations is different from the presets or "favorites" that the user has programmed. Just as with analog TV (which worked only by turning a preset on or off for each station/channel), users of digital television adapters and other similar tuners can choose to ignore channels that are still in the channel map.

Analog station presets and digital channel maps are normally deleted when a new scan is started. On some tuners, digital channel maps can be added-to with an "easy-add" channel scan, which is useful for finding new stations without losing old ones that may be weak or currently off-air, or not aimed-at with an antenna rotator or other set-top TV antenna adjustment. If a station adds a digital subchannel, most digital TV tuners will find it automatically as soon as the user turns to another channel that is carried by that station, adding it to the channel map.

Many will also automatically add a new digital station's subchannels by tuning manually to the station's physical channel, though if this conflicts with the virtual channel number of another station, a complete re-scan may be the only solution. (Choosing an unused subchannel number [i.e. 30.99] on that major channel number [i.e. 30] may avoid the remap on existing subchannels [i.e. 30.1] and force the tuner to listen on that physical channel.) This has often happened in the U.S., where stations (especially LPTV) find it easiest to place their digital operations on a vacated analog channel.

The same problem also occurs when the same station moves its digital transmission back to its old analog channel. There is no way to delete a station from the internal channel map, and a re-scan may be needed; or if the new physical channel is found, it may leave the old mapping in place, causing duplicate channels that cannot be accessed through direct entry of the numbers without also pressing the channel-up/down buttons.

Many modern TV sets do an ACMS scan automatically as part of the setup process the user is guided through when the device is initially plugged-in. While early sets often lost their memory in a power outage or by otherwise being disconnected from mains electricity, all of them now have non-volatile RAM or a backup of some sort.
