= Scedu Tender Readiness Toolkit =

The Scedu (Sheffield Community Enterprise Development Unit) Tender Readiness Toolkit was released in March 2006 as a practical resource for social enterprises looking at procurement.

The Tender Readiness Toolkit was adopted by many leading social enterprises since its launch, and received warm backing from across the public sector and social enterprise sector nationally and locally in South Yorkshire.

== Background ==
The issue of procurement was particularly important in South Yorkshire as many mainstream funding opportunities were diminishing with the end of the Single Regeneration Budget (SRB) and the European Union's expansion leading to a decrease in Objective 1 Structural funds.

Sheffield City Council approved a report in April 2004 entitled A policy for the expansion of opportunities for social enterprises through public procurement and planning policies which outlined the council's ambition for a mixed economy of provision through procurement:

"A thriving social enterprise sector in the city is also a mechanism for bringing excluded groups into the labour market, raising skill levels and increasing future employability, which in turn improves the quality of life for the individuals concerned and their families and helps to secure the sustainability of communities."

This built upon Central Government's The National Procurement Strategy for Local Government (2003) which spelt out that effective procurement would help local authorities to achieve their Community/City Plan objectives.

== What it did ==
The Scedu Tender Readiness Toolkit differed from the likes of the DTI's 2003 report Public procurement: a toolkit for social enterprises, in that it offered a practical solution for social enterprises and voluntary and community organisations to assess their options, benchmark their current status, set development targets, and find contract opportunities. It was produced in cd-rom format and was specifically designed to be easy and practical for people to use.

== Tools of the trade award ==
The Tender Readiness Toolkit won a Tools of the Trade award run by BURA(the British Urban Regeneration Association) in June 2007. The judges marked the Toolkit against components identified by Sir John Egan as those of a sustainable community. The judges commented "An excellent piece of work with accessible documentation and a staged process which allows for progression through the process of getting an organisation in the kind of shape needed to tender as well as writing up the content of a tender."

== Version 2 ==
Tender Readiness Toolkit V2

An updated version of the Tender Readiness Toolkit was released in July 2007, termed V2, and containing new tools, updated links, and more information about social enterprise and public sector procurement.
