= Cognitive metaphor =

Cognitive metaphor refers to certain kinds of metaphors.

- The same as a Conceptual metaphor in cognitive science
- An approach to an Interface metaphor in computing
