= Souptoys =

2006 video game

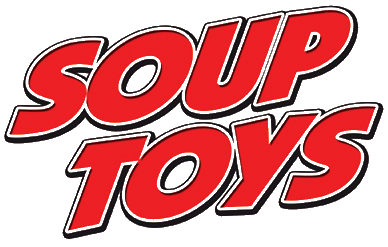
- Developer: Souptoys Pty Ltd
- Publisher: Oberon Media
- Platforms: Windows 2000, Windows XP, Windows Vista, Windows 7
- Release: WW: 2006
- Genre: Sandbox game
- Mode: Single player

Souptoys Toybox, also known simply as Souptoys, is a physics-based sandbox video game and "desktop toy" program for the Microsoft Windows systems. It was developed by a group of friends known as the Soupboys, based in Western Australia. Initially made available for purchase sometime in early 2006, Souptoys was released as freeware on July 14 of the same year. A number of updates have been released that add new toys to the game, although the game's official website is no longer accessible.

== Gameplay ==
Souptoys includes a variety of physics-based objects which can be dragged from the "toybox" window onto the desktop, with the ability to be thrown and moved around with a computer mouse. Some objects, such as balls, cannons, gears, titling platforms, and colored wooden blocks, allow for level-building and the construction of Rube Goldberg-like contraptions, which could then be saved as a "playset" file and uploaded to the Souptoys website for others to download. Several pre-made playsets are also included with the base game. While Souptoys overlays itself directly on to the player's screen, there is also an option to turn on a background which hides the desktop and any open programs with a blue checkerboard pattern.

Toys are divided into themed categories; Sports, Make & Break, Ted's Castle, Souper Six, Bumble Party, Pirates, Astrobots, Soup Labs, and Christmas Toys.

== Reception ==
Reception

Review score
Publication	Score
CNET (Download.com)	4.5/5

The game was received positively, with PC World describing the game as "amusing", although noting that the game can "eat up a lot of time if you're not careful." Lifehacker praised the game as a "nice stress reliever for adults", but similarly mentioned "the potential to be the biggest productivity killer of all time." Download.com editors' review compliments the number of pre-included playsets and verdicts that "the whole point of the game is experimentation".
