= Barrier pointing =

UI design technique used for accessibility

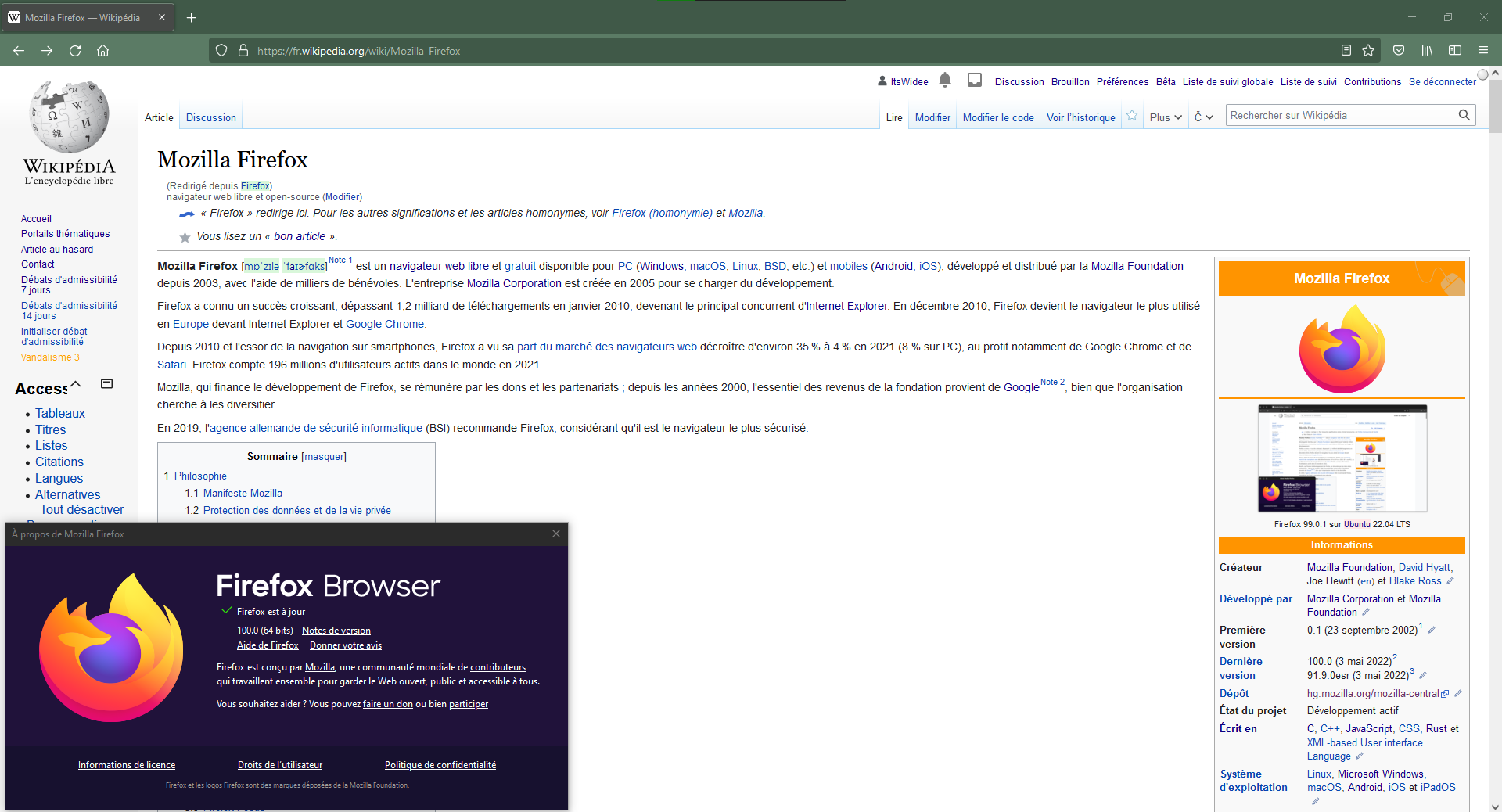
The Firefox window places important functions such as the scrollbar, titlebar functions (minimize, maximize, close), and tab navigation at the edge of the interface, where they require less precision to use.

Barrier pointing (or "edge pointing") is a term used in human–computer interaction to describe a design technique in which targets are placed on the peripheral borders of touchscreen interfaces to aid in motor control. Where targets are placed alongside raised edges on mobile devices, the user has a physical barrier to aid navigation, useful for situational impairments such as walking; similarly, screen edges that stop the cursor mean that targets placed along screen edges require less precise movements to select. This allows the most common or important functions to be placed on the edge of a user interface, while other functions that may require more precision can utilise the interface's 'open space'.

Barrier pointing is also a term used in accessible design, as a design technique that makes targets easier to press. For example, barrier pointing using raised edges on touchscreens, alongside a stylus and a 'lift-off' or 'take-off' selection mode, can improve usability for a user with cerebral palsy.

One example of assistive technology focused on barrier pointing is the SUPPLE system, which redesigns the size, shape, and arrangement of interfaces based on its measurement of motor articulation input.

== Bibliography ==
- Farris, J. S., Jones, K. S. and Anders, B. A. (2001). "Acquisition speed with targets on the edge of the screen: An application of Fitts' Law to commonly used web browser controls." Proceedings of the Human Factors and Ergonomics Society 45th Annual Meeting (HFES '01). Santa Monica, California: Human Factors and Ergonomics Society, pp. 1205–1209.
- Johnson, B. R., Farris, J. S. and Jones, K. S. (2003). "Selection of web browser controls with and without impenetrable borders: Does width make a difference?" Proceedings of the Human Factors and Ergonomics Society 47th Annual Meeting (HFES '03). Santa Monica, California: Human Factors and Ergonomics Society, pp. 1380–1384.
- Wobbrock, J. O. (2003). "The benefits of physical edges in gesture-making: Empirical support for an edge-based unistroke alphabet." Extended Abstracts of the ACM Conference on Human Factors in Computing Systems (CHI '03). New York: ACM Press, pp. 942–943.
- Walker, N. and Smelcer, J. B. (1990). "A comparison of selection time from walking and bar menus." Proceedings of the ACM Conference on Human Factors in Computing Systems (CHI '90). New York: ACM Press, pp. 221–225.
