= Robic =

Robic (Russian: Робик) is a programming language created in the USSR for primary school education (8–11 years old children). It was developed in 1975 and later modified to be included in a software system called "Schoolgirl" for the computer Agat.

The language uses syntax based on the Russian vocabulary.

An interesting language feature is a performer, an object that functions in a certain environment, which is different for each performer. It is possible to create and delete instances of different types of performers. Each performer type has its own collection of commands, expanding the list of commands available in the language itself.
