= Agat (computer) =

Soviet personal computer series

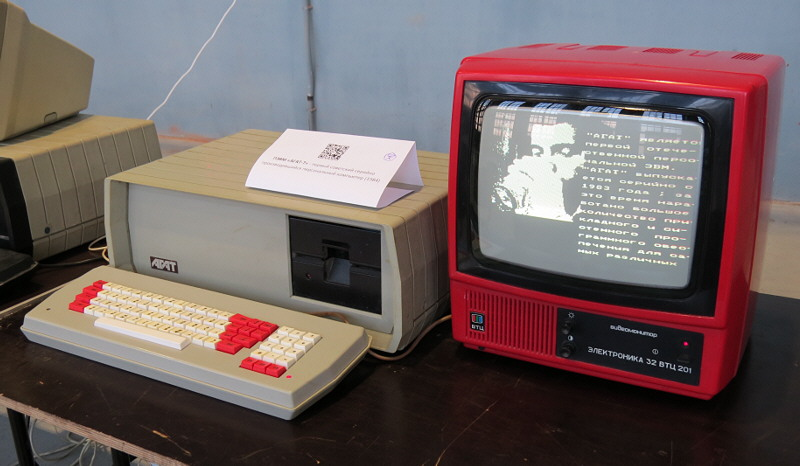
- Agat-7 with 140 Kbytes FDD
- Manufacturer: Three factories, including LEMZ
- Type: Personal computer
- Released: 1983; 43 years ago
- Lifespan: 1993
- Introductory price: 3,900 rubles
- Media: Compact Cassettes, 5¼-inch floppy disks
- Operating system: BASIC, Assembler
- CPU: MCS6502 and compatibles @ 1Mhz
- Memory: 96 KB (Agat-7), 128 KB or 256 KB (Agat-9) RAM, 2 KB ROM
- Display: 32×32 color text mode, 32×64 b/w text mode, graphics: 64×64 (16 colors), 128×128 (8 colors), 256×256 (black and white)
- Sound: Internal speaker
- Input: Keyboard
- Power: Internal Power Supply (220 V, 60 W)
- Dimensions: 460 cm × 350 cm × 160 cm (181 inches × 138 inches × 63 inches)
- Weight: 9 kg (19.8 lbs)

The Agat (Russian: Агат) was a series of 8-bit computers produced in the Soviet Union. It used the same MOS Technology 6502 microprocessor as Apple II and BBC Micro, among many others. Commissioned by the USSR Ministry of Radio, for many years it was a popular microcomputer in Soviet schools.

The Agat was first introduced at a Moscow trade fair in 1983. It was primarily produced between 1984 and 1990, although a limited number of units may have been manufactured as late as 1993. By 1988, about 12,000 units had been produced. Over 9 months in 1989 about 7,000 machines were built.

There are several versions of the machine (Agat-4 to 9), with progressive enhancements to memory, video modes and compatibility with Apple II.

== Architecture and design ==
The Agat was inspired primarily by the Apple II, though being largely different from it in design. A domestically produced "partitioned 588 series" CPU was used on early pre-production series, which simulated the MOS Technology 6502 microprocessor instruction set. While this permitted some degree of compatibility with the Apple, timing differences between the two CPUs rendered certain tasks (such as floppy disk access and sound generation) incompatible. Later models incorporated actual MOS 6502 CPUs which permitted a greater degree of interoperability between the two platforms.

Early editions of the Agat came with a cassette tape reader and a keyboard, although later editions replaced the tape reader with a 5¼ inch floppy disk drive. The keyboard utilised the standard Russian keyboard layout, and offered a choice between either Cyrillic or Latin symbols. Earlier models had very limited upgradeability, but later models incorporated additional upgrade and peripheral slots to allow expansion. Other available peripherals included a printer, mouse, and memory upgrades. The display was provided through a 30 cm (11.8 inch) SECAM television, rather than a specialised computer monitor, that was connected to the rest of the machine through a 1 metre (3.3 feet) long cable.

== Versions ==
Apart from the initial model, there were a number of different versions of the Agat produced:

- Agat-4: A small quantity of this model was released in 1983. While popular, it quickly became obsolete.
- Agat-7: The first mass-produced model, introduced in 1984, it featured more internal memory (96 KB) and disk capabilities than the Agat-4.
- Agat-8: An updated and enhanced version of the Agat-7.
- Agat-9: The final mass-produced model, introduced in 1986 with many improvements upon the Agat-7 and Agat-8, including additional video modes, improved memory management (128 KB or 256 KB), and improved compatibility with the Apple II + 64K.
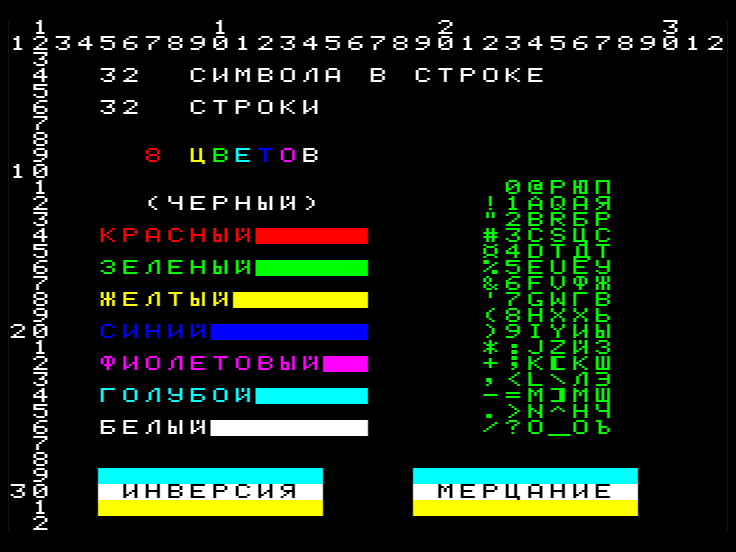
Agat 32x32 text mode

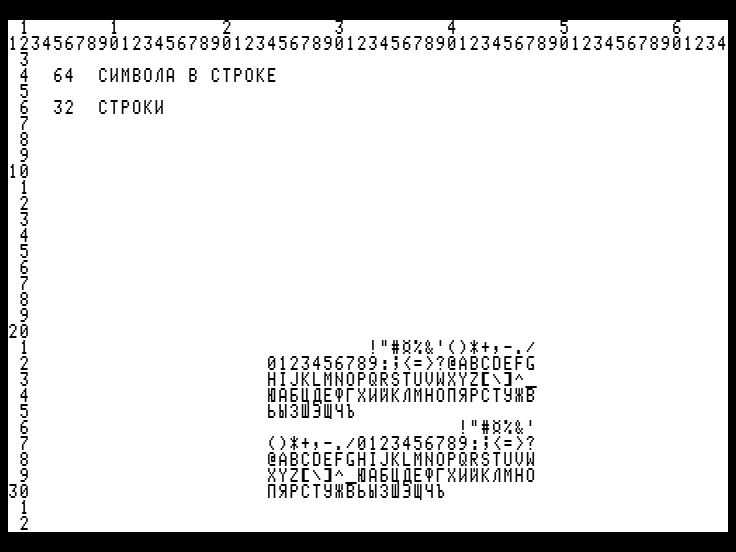
Agat 64x32 text mode

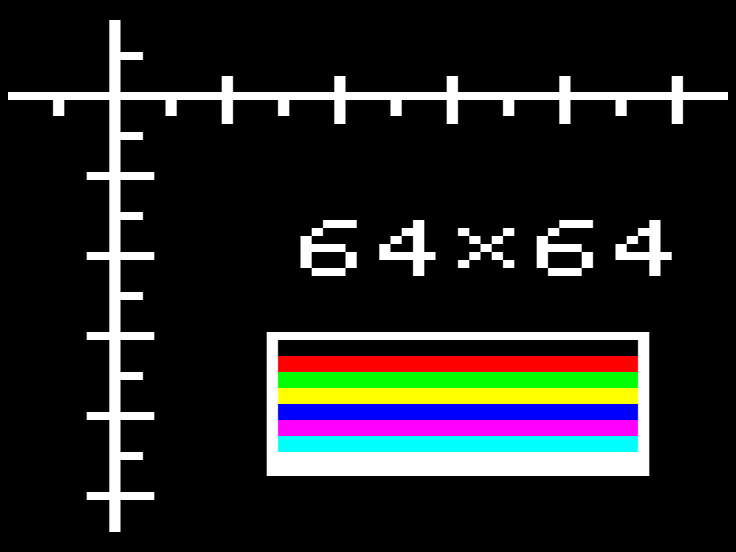
Agat 64x64 pixel mode

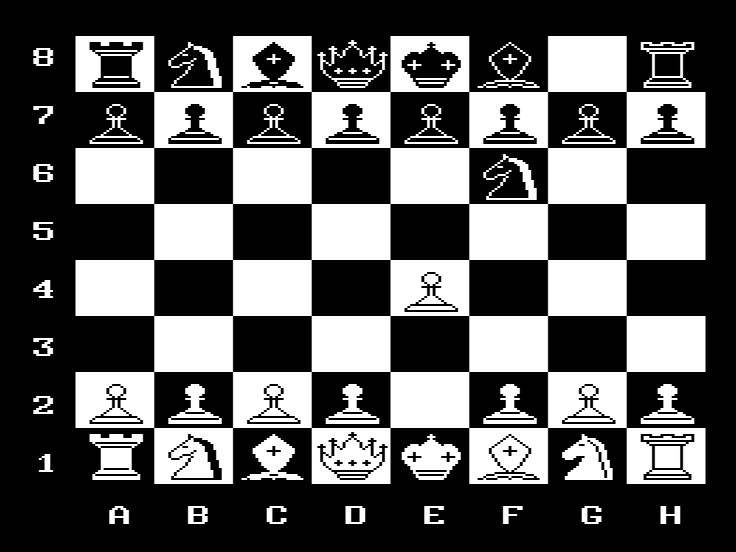
Agat-7 chess game

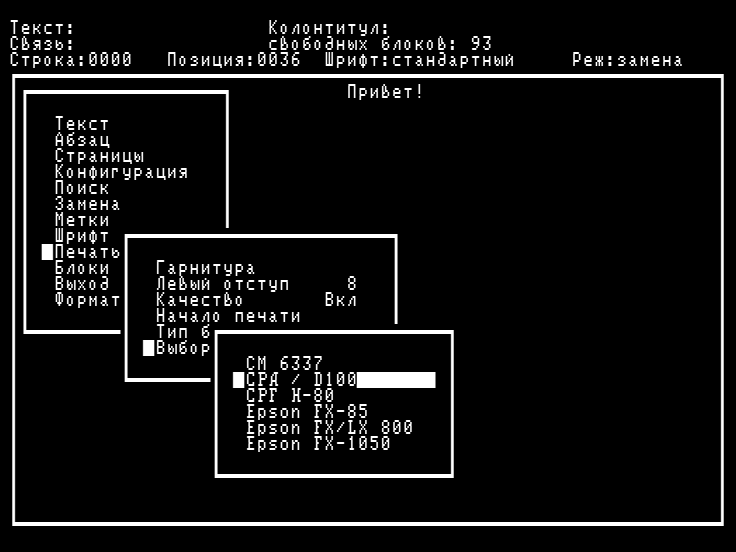
Agat-7 WordMaster text editor

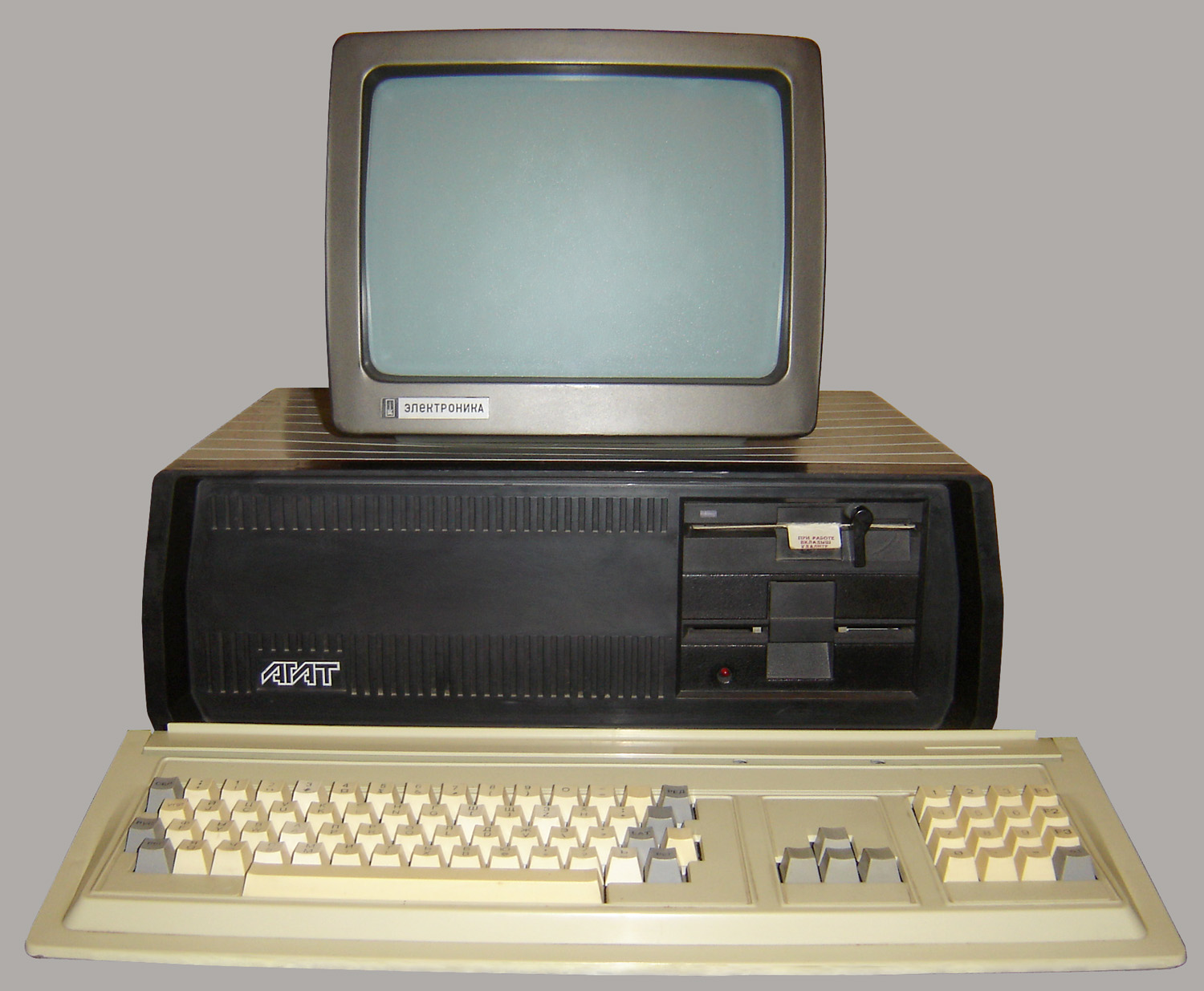
Agat-9

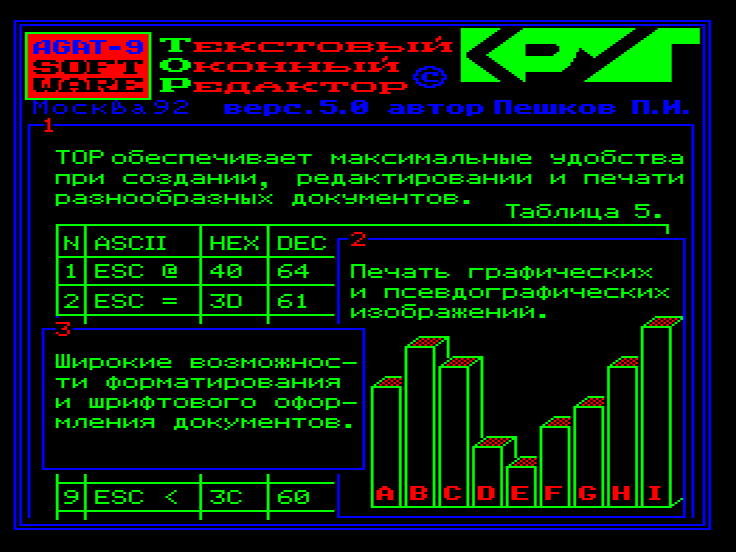
Agat-9 256x256 pixel mode

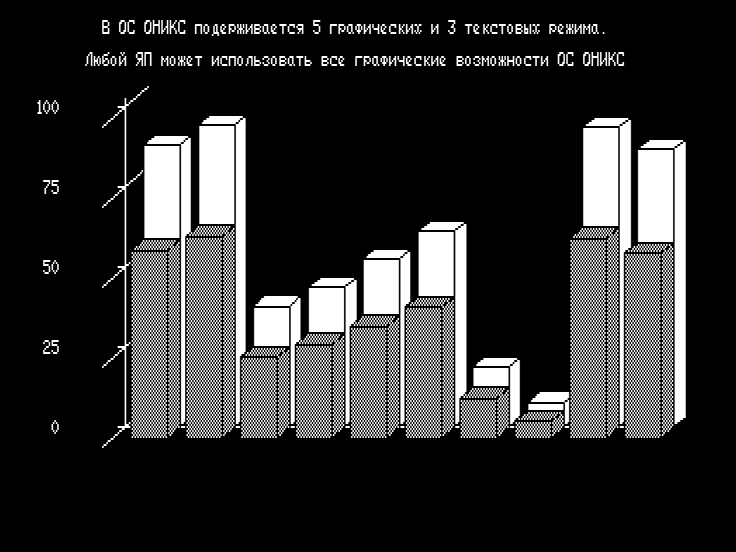
Agat-9 512x256 pixel mode

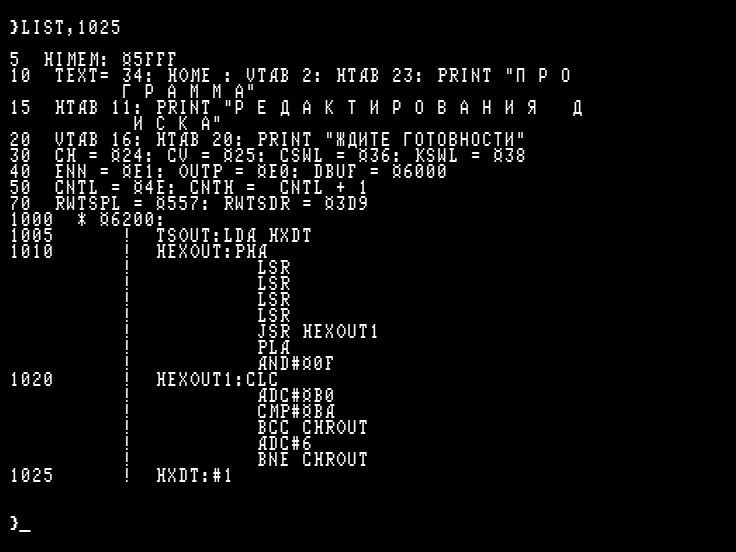
Agat-9 BASIC program example

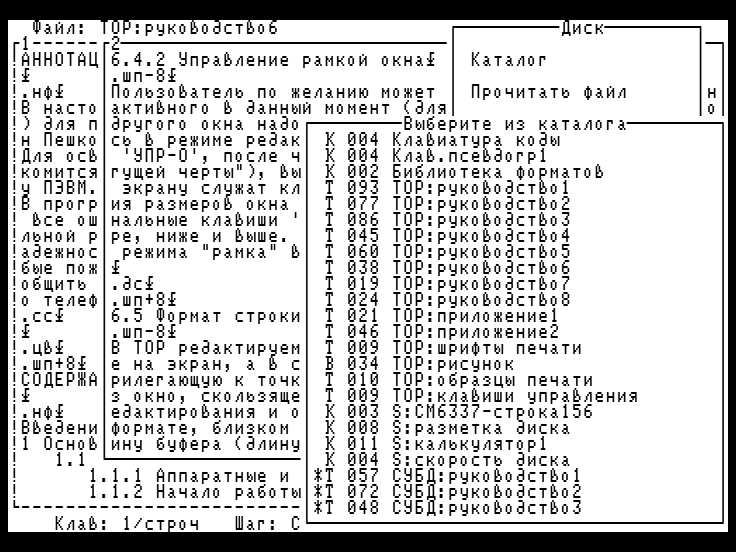
Agat-9 Tor text editor

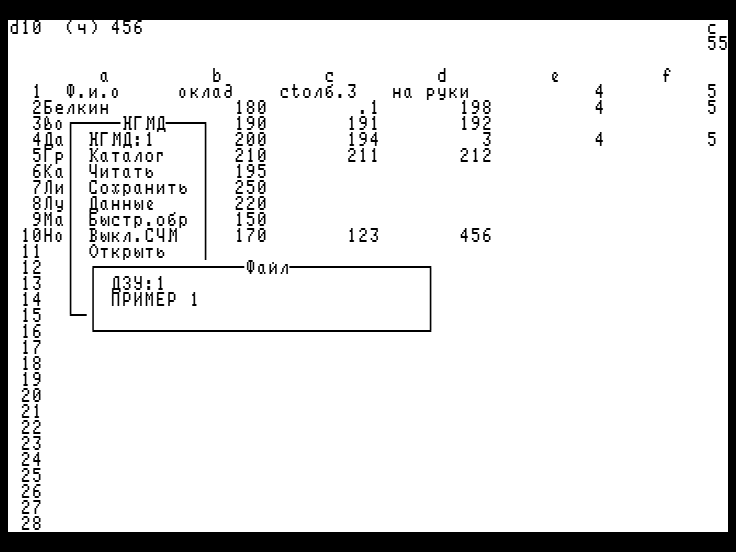
Agat-9 SCHM (VisiCalc clone)

== Production ==
The initial run of Agat-4 machines were produced at the Lianozovsky Electromechanical Plant (LEMZ). Production was difficult, as the LEMZ facilities were more intended for the production of motor vehicles and radar equipment, rather than computers, and the administration of the plant was not closely associated with the designers of the Agat. Future production runs occurred at more appropriate facilities such as the Volzhsky Plant of Computer Technology (EWT) and the Zagorski Electromechanical Plant (ZEMZ).

== Usage ==
Compared to other computers available in the Soviet Union at the time, the Agat was several times cheaper, which led to its widespread adoption in schools and other educational institutions across the Soviet Union and the Eastern Bloc. This is reflected in the fact that most of the software available for the Agat is of an educational nature—including a BASIC interpreter, text editing programs, and the "Shkol'nitsa" ("schoolgirl") package, designed to assist teachers in the classroom.

The official selling price for the Agat was 3,900 rubles, as much as twenty times the average monthly salary, which put it out of reach of all but the most privileged of private individuals.

== Software ==
- "Schoolgirl" with Robic programming language included.

== Reception ==
BYTE in November 1984 called Agat "a bad copy of the Apple". While stating "my overall impressions were favorable, considering the source", the reviewer found that "the operating system and ROM seemed to be a direct lift from the Apple", the internals were a "nightmarish wire maze", and that performance was noticeably slower than that of a real Apple. He reported that ELORG planned to sell the computer (with software) for $17,000, and that its officials were "shocked" when told how much computing power that amount of money would purchase in the United States. The reviewer concluded, "it wouldn't stand a chance in today's international market, even if they gave it away. It has neither the polish nor the sophistication to compete".

Yuri Rogachyov, one of the key figures in the history of the Soviet computer industry, co-founder of M-series computers, and head of the Scientific Research Institute of Computer Complexes in 1983—1988, stated that Agat computers were not produced at the time when the BYTE reviewer arrived in the Soviet Union, and that what he saw during a visit to the Fyodorov Eye Microsurgery Complex in Moscow in 1982 was a custom-built mock-up device intended for testing and debugging medical software, bearing little relation to even the early Agat systems.
