= Desktop metaphor =

Concept used on desktop computer graphical user interfaces

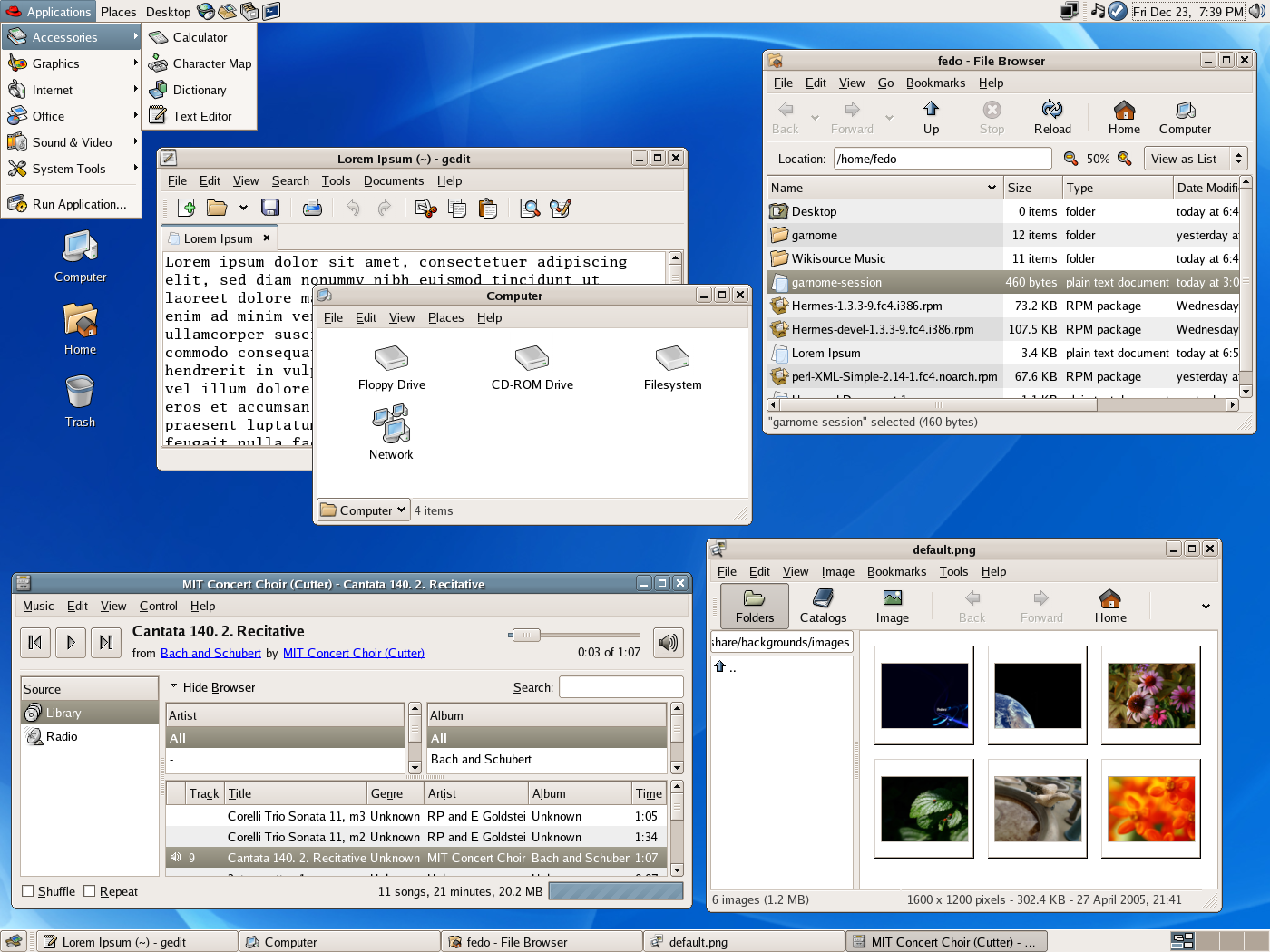
A computer desktop, with various folders and files visible, including a manila folder and a trash can

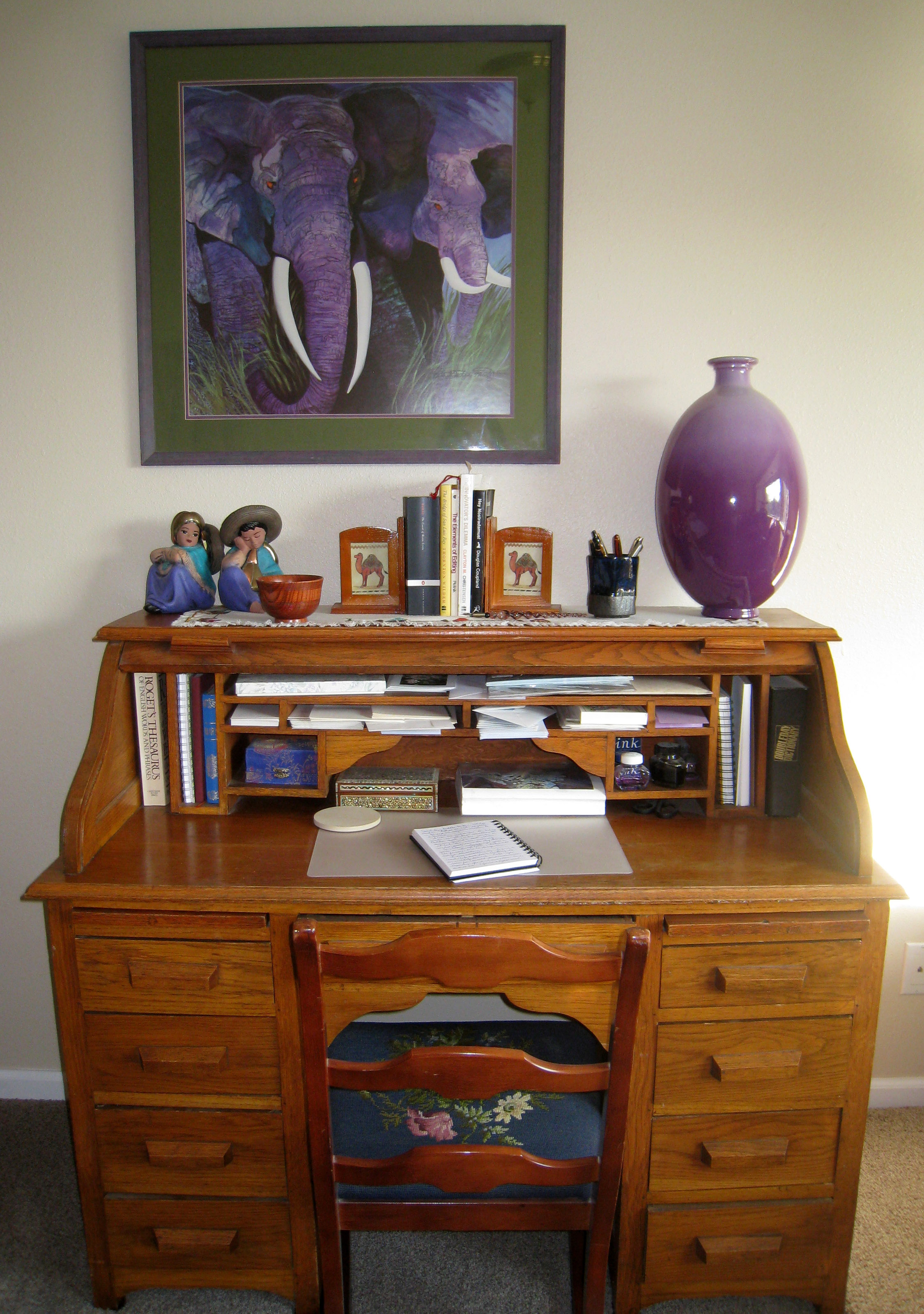
The computer interface is a conceptual metaphor of a writing desk.

In computing, the desktop metaphor is an interface metaphor which is a set of unifying concepts used by graphical user interfaces to help users interact more easily with the computer. The desktop metaphor treats the computer monitor as if it is the top of the user's desk, upon which objects such as documents and folders of documents can be placed. A document can be opened into a window, which represents a paper copy of the document placed on the desktop. Small applications, called desk accessories are also available, such as a desk calculator or notepad, etc.

The desktop metaphor itself has been extended and stretched with various implementations of desktop environments, since access to features and usability of the computer are usually more important than maintaining the 'purity' of the metaphor. Hence one can find trash cans on the desktop, as well as disks and network volumes (which can be thought of as filing cabinets—not something normally found on a desktop). Other features such as menu bars or taskbars have no direct counterpart on a real-world desktop, though this may vary by environment and the function provided; for instance, a familiar wall calendar can sometimes be displayed or otherwise accessed via a taskbar or menu bar belonging to the desktop.

== History ==
The desktop metaphor was first introduced by Alan Kay, David C. Smith, and others at Xerox's Palo Alto Research Center (PARC) in 1970 and elaborated in a series of innovative software applications developed by PARC scientists throughout the ensuing decade. The first computer to use an early version of the desktop metaphor was the experimental Xerox Alto, and the first commercial computer that adopted this kind of interface was the Xerox Star. The use of window controls to contain related information predates the desktop metaphor, with a primitive version appearing in Douglas Engelbart's "Mother of All Demos", though it was incorporated by PARC in the environment of the Smalltalk language.

One of the first desktop-like interfaces on the market was a program called Magic Desk I. Built as a cartridge for the Commodore 64 home computer in 1983, a very primitive GUI presented a low resolution sketch of a desktop, complete with telephone, drawers, calculator, etc. The user made their choices by moving a sprite depicting a hand pointing by using the same joystick the user may have used for video gaming. Onscreen options were chosen by pushing the fire button on the joystick. The Magic Desk I program featured a typewriter graphically emulated complete with audio effects. Other applications included a calculator, rolodex organiser, and a terminal emulator. Files could be archived into the drawers of the desktop. A trashcan was also present.

The first computer to popularise the desktop metaphor, using it as a standard feature over the earlier command-line interface was the Apple Macintosh in 1984. The desktop metaphor is ubiquitous in modern-day personal computing; it is found in most desktop environments of modern operating systems: Windows as well as macOS, Linux, and other Unix-like systems.

BeOS observed the desktop metaphor more strictly than many other systems. For example, external hard drives appeared on the 'desktop', while internal ones were accessed clicking on an icon representing the computer itself. By comparison, the Mac OS places all drives on the desktop itself by default, while in Windows the user can access the drives through an icon labelled "Computer".

Amiga terminology for its desktop metaphor was taken directly from workshop jargon. The desktop was called Workbench, programs were called tools, small applications (applets) were utilities, directories were drawers, etc. Icons of objects were animated and the directories are shown as drawers which were represented as either open or closed. As in the classic Mac OS and macOS desktop, an icon for a floppy disk or CD-ROM would appear on the desktop when the disk was inserted into the drive, as it was a virtual counterpart of a physical floppy disk or CD-ROM on the surface of a workbench.

== Paper paradigm ==
Xerox Star showing an application and icons on the desktop

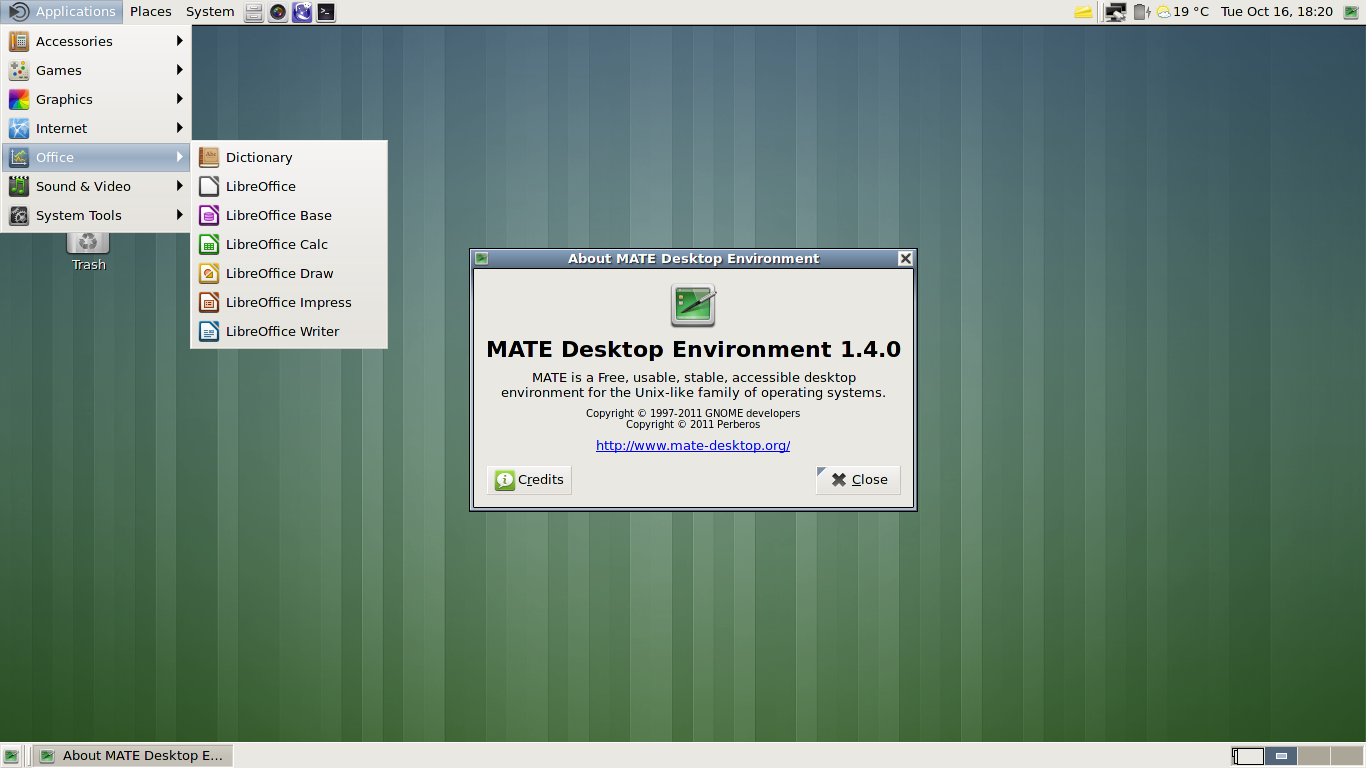
MATE desktop environment running on Debian showing the desktop, application menu, and About MATE window

The paper paradigm refers to the paradigm used by most modern computers and operating systems. The paper paradigm consists of, usually, black text on a white background, files within folders, and a "desktop". The paper paradigm was created by many individuals and organisations, such as Douglas Engelbart, Xerox PARC, and Apple Computer, and was an attempt to make computers more user-friendly by making them resemble the common workplace of the time (with papers, folders, and a desktop). It was first presented to the public by Engelbart in 1968, in what is now referred to as "The Mother of All Demos".

From John Siracusa:

Back in 1984, explanations of the original Mac interface to users who had never seen a GUI before inevitably included an explanation of icons that went something like this: "This icon represents your file on disk." But to the surprise of many, users very quickly discarded any semblance of indirection. This icon is my file. My file is this icon. One is not a "representation of" or an "interface to" the other. Such relationships were foreign to most people, and constituted unnecessary mental baggage when there was a much more simple and direct connection to what they knew of reality.

Since then, many aspects of computers have wandered away from the paper paradigm by implementing features such as "shortcuts" to files, hypertext, and non-spatial file browsing. A shortcut (a link to a file that acts as a redirecting proxy, not the actual file) and hypertext have no real-world equivalent. Non-spatial file browsing, as well, may confuse novice users, as they can often have more than one window representing the same folder open at the same time, something that is impossible in reality. These and other departures from real-world equivalents are violations of the pure paper paradigm.

== See also ==
- Desktop environment
- File browser
- History of the GUI
- Interface metaphor
- Operating system
- Skeuomorph
- Tiling window manager
- Virtual desktop
- WIMP (computing)
