= Interface metaphor =

User interface item resembling a familiar physical item

In user interface design, an interface metaphor is a set of user interface visuals, actions and procedures that exploit specific knowledge that users already have of other domains. The purpose of the interface metaphor is to give the user instantaneous knowledge about how to interact with the user interface. They are designed to be similar to physical entities but also have their own properties (e.g., desktop metaphor and web portals). They can be based on an activity, an object (skeuomorph), or a combination of both and work with users' familiar knowledge to help them understand 'the unfamiliar', and placed in the terms so the user may better understand.

An example of an interface metaphor is the file and folder analogy for the file system of an operating system. Another example is the tree view representation of a file system, as in a file manager.

== Generation of metaphors ==
=== Historical contributions ===
In the mid-twentieth century, computers were extremely rare and used only by specialists. They were equipped with complicated interfaces comprehensible only to these select few. In 1968, Douglas Engelbart gave a demonstration which astonished executives at Xerox. They began work on what would eventually become the Xerox Alto. In 1973, Xerox completed work on the first personal computer, the Xerox Alto, which had a sophisticated graphical user interface (GUI) involving windows, icons, menus and a pointer. (WIMP) Unfortunately, the Xerox Alto and its successor, the Xerox Star, were far too expensive for the average consumer, and suffered from poor marketing. In 1984, Apple Computer launched the Apple Macintosh, which was the first affordable and commercially successful personal computer to include a graphical user interface. The Macintosh was the second Apple Computer to ship with a graphical user interface, with the Apple Lisa being the first. In 1985, Microsoft released Microsoft Windows, which bore a striking resemblance to both Macintosh, and to the Alto's interface. Windows eventually overtook Apple in the PC market to become the predominant GUI-based operating system.

== Evaluation ==
Software designers attempt to make computer applications easier to use for both novice and expert users by creating concrete metaphors that resemble the users' real-world experiences. Continual technological improvement has made metaphors depict these real-world experiences more realistically to ultimately enhance interface performance. Beginning users, however, could use a sort of help box, because the metaphor is not always going to be clear enough for them to understand, no matter how much effort its programmers devote to making it resemble something the users understand. Experts, on the other hand, understand what is going on with the technical aspects of an interface metaphor. They know what they want to do and they know how to do it—and so they design shortcuts to facilitate achieving their goals.

While the concept behind interface metaphors appears simple (to promote more efficient facilitation of a computer), a lack of empirical evidence exists to support these claims. Little research has actually been completed that demonstrates the benefits of implementing metaphors in computer systems as well as what makes a metaphor most effective.

== See also ==
- Human–computer interaction
- Skeuomorph
