= Post-WIMP =

User Interface systems

In computing, post-WIMP ("windows, icons, menus, pointer") comprises work on user interfaces, mostly graphical user interfaces, which attempt to go beyond the paradigm of windows, icons, menus and a pointing device, i.e. WIMP interfaces.

The reason WIMP interfaces have become so prevalent since their conception at Xerox PARC is that they are very good at abstracting work-spaces, documents, and their actions. Their analogous desktop metaphor to documents as paper sheets or folders makes WIMP interfaces easy to introduce to new users. Furthermore their basic representations as rectangular regions on a 2D flat screen make them a good fit for system programmers, thus favoring the abundance of commercial widget toolkits in this style.

However, WIMP interfaces are not optimal for working with certain tasks or through input devices which differ from a mouse and keyboard. WIMPs are usually pixel-hungry, so given limited screen real estate they can distract attention from the task at hand. Thus, other interfaces can better encapsulate workspaces, actions, and objects for such tasks.

Interfaces based on these considerations, now called "post-WIMP", have made their way to the general public in mobile and embedded applications. Meanwhile, software for desktop computer workstations still uses WIMP interfaces, but has started undergoing major operational changes as desktop marketshare declines. These include the exploration of virtual 3D space, interaction techniques for window/icon sorting, focus, and embellishment.

The seminal paper for post-WIMP interfaces is "Non Command User Interfaces" by Jakob Nielsen 1993, followed by "The Anti-Mac Interface". Updated proposals are discussed in "Post-WIMP user interfaces" by Andries van Dam. Michel Beaudouin-Lafon subsequently proposed a framework called instrumental interaction, that defines a design space for Post-WIMP interaction techniques and a set of properties for comparing them. Examples of Post-WIMP interaction include 3D interaction and reality-based interaction.

== Examples ==
- Computer game
- Virtual reality systems
- Gesture-based interfaces
- Voice user interfaces
- See-through tools
- Smartphones and mobile apps
- Zooming user interfaces
- Tangible user interfaces
- Web applications

== See also ==
- 10-foot user interface
- Natural user interface
