= Cycle button =

User interface element

A cycle button

A cycle button or toggle button is a graphical control element that allows the user to choose one from a predefined set of options. It is used as a button, the content of which changes with each click and cycles between two or more values; the currently displayed value is the user's choice.

A cycle button's advantage over radio buttons or a list box is that it takes less screen space; its advantage over a drop-down list is that a single mouse click is enough to switch between the two options. The disadvantage is if the button has many options, many clicks are needed to switch to the desired one. This is why some GUI environments have the ability to display the same element as a cycle button or a drop-down list, depending on the number of options.
