= Web navigation =

Following hyperlinks on the World Wide Web

Navigating to English Wikipedia using a web browser

Web navigation is the process of navigating a network of information resources in the World Wide Web, which is organized as hypertext or hypermedia. The user interface that is used to do so is called a web browser.

A central theme in web design is the development of a web navigation interface that maximizes usability.

A website overall navigational scheme includes several navigational pieces such as global, local, supplemental, and contextual navigation; all of these are vital aspects of the broad topic of web navigation. Hierarchical navigation systems are vital as well since it is the primary navigation system. It allows for the user to navigate within the site using levels alone, which is often seen as restricting and requires additional navigation systems to better structure the website. The global navigation of a website, as another segment of web navigation, serves as the outline and template in order to achieve an easy maneuver for the users accessing the site, while local navigation is often used to help the users within a specific section of the site. All these navigational pieces fall under the categories of various types of web navigation, allowing for further development and for more efficient experiences upon visiting a web page.

== History ==
Web navigation came about with the introduction of the World Wide Web in 1989, when Tim Berners-Lee invented it. Once the World Wide Web was available, web navigation increasingly became a major aspect and role in jobs and everyday lives. With one-third of the world’s population now using the Internet, web navigation maintains a global use in today's ever evolving international society. Web navigation is not restricted to just computers, either, as mobile phones and tablets have added avenues for access to the ever-growing information on the Web today. The most recent wave of technology which has affected web navigation is the introduction and growth of the smartphone. Web navigation has evolved from a restricted action, to something that many people across the world now do on a daily basis.

== Types of web navigation ==
The use of website navigation tools allow for a website's visitors to experience the site with the most efficiency and the least incompetence. A website navigation system is analogous to a road map which enables web page visitors to explore and discover different areas and information contained within the website.

There are many different types of website navigation:

=== Hierarchical website navigation ===
The structure of the website navigation is built from general to specific. This provides a clear, simple path to all the web pages from anywhere on the website.

=== Global website navigation ===
Global website navigation shows the top level sections/pages of the website. It is available on each page and lists the main content sections/pages of the website.

=== Local website navigation ===
Local navigation is the links within the text of a given web page, linking to other pages within the website.

== Styles of web navigation ==
Web navigations vary in styles between different website as well as within a certain site. The availability of different navigational styles allows for the information in the website to be delivered easily and directly. This also differentiates between categories and the sites themselves to indicate what the vital information is and to enable the users access to more information and facts discussed within the website. Across the globe, different cultures prefer certain styles for web navigations, allowing for a more enjoyable and functional experience as navigational styles expand and differentiate.

- Navigation bar: A navigation bar or (navigation system) is a section of a website or online page intended to aid visitors in travelling through the online document.
- Sitemap: A site map (or sitemap) is a list of pages of a web site accessible to crawlers or users. It can be either a document in any form used as a planning tool for web design, or a web page that lists the pages on a website, typically organized in hierarchical fashion.
- Dropdown menu: In computing with graphical user interfaces, a dropdown menu or drop-down menu or drop-down list is a user interface control GUI element ("widget" or "control"), similar to a list box, which allows the user to choose one value from a list.
- Flyout menu: In computing with graphical user interfaces, a menu that flies out (either down or to the side) when you click or hover (mouseover) some GUI element.
- Named anchor: An anchor element is called an anchor because web designers can use it to anchor a URL to some text on a web page. When users view the web page in a browser, they can click the text to activate the link and visit the page whose URL is in the link.

== Design of web navigation ==
What makes web design navigation difficult to work with is that it can be so versatile. Navigation varies in design through the presence of a few main pages in comparison to multi-level architecture. Content can also vary between logged-in users and logged-out users and more. Because navigation has so many differences between websites, there are no set guidelines or to-do lists for organizing navigation. Designing navigation is all about using good information architecture, and expressing the model or concept of information used in activities requiring explicit details of complex systems.

== See also ==
- Human–computer interaction
- Information and communications technology
- Interaction technique
- Web literacy (navigation)
- Web traffic
- Web directory
- Webring
