= Dropdown =

Dropdown or drop-down may refer to:

- Drop-down list
- Drop-down curtain
