= Unclick =

Term in the context of computing

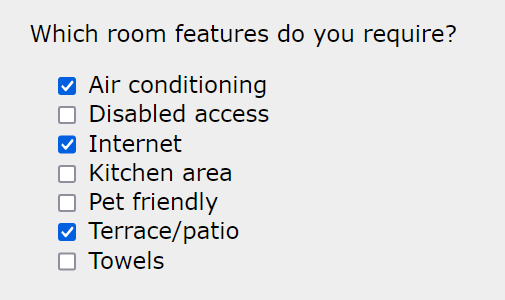
A web page menu showing which preferences are in effect. By using a mouse or graphical pointer, a user can move a cursor over selected terms, and un-check or unclick them, if the software permits it.

A checkbox is a graphical user interface element in which a computer user can make multiple selections from an array of options.

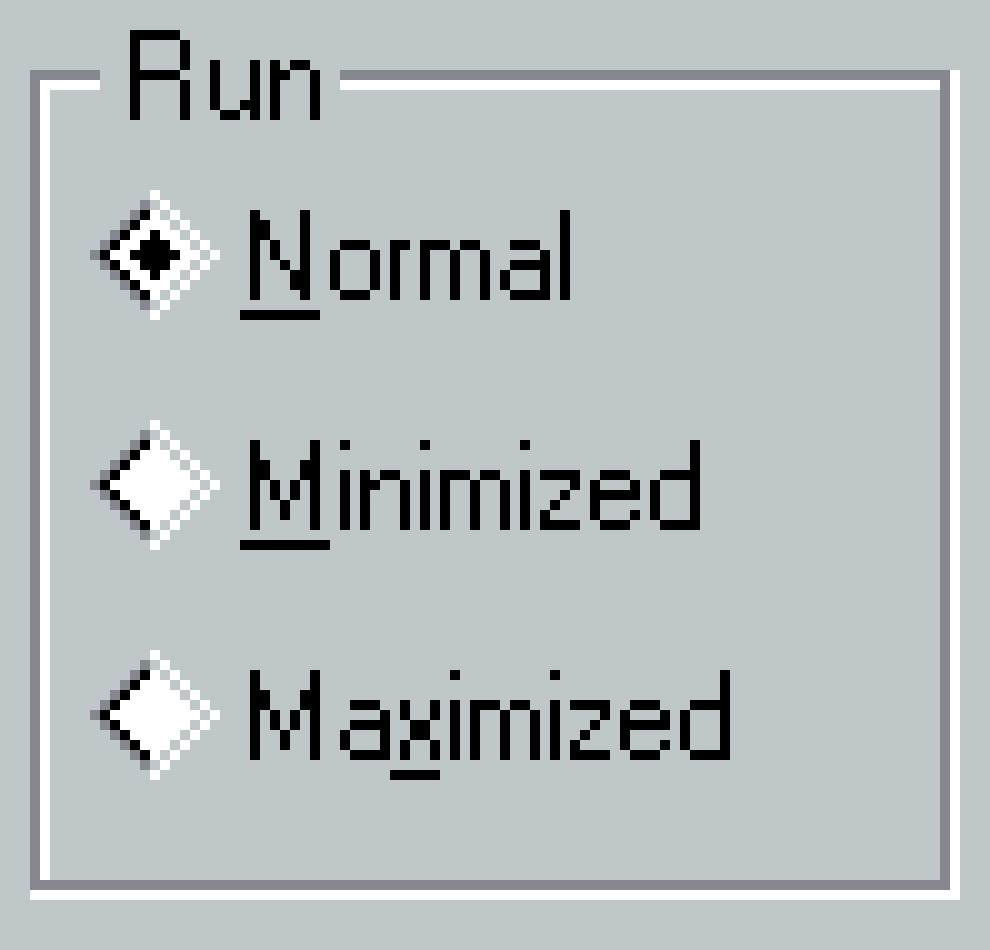
A user generally cannot unclick a radio button; one option must be selected.

In computer interface design, to unclick is to deselect a specific preference, typically by tapping a selected checkbox with a finger or cursor. As a result, the check mark image or dark circle inside the box is removed.

== Background ==
As the Internet becomes an increasingly popular medium for marketers, vendors and marketers often presume that a user will prefer certain choices, such as receiving emails in the future, having specific computer settings, or preferring that specific programs will be operational when a computer is turned on. As a result, it is sometimes necessary for a user to unclick these choices to avoid exposure to unwanted advertising, or to avoid a situation in which a different website is chosen for one's home page.

In Internet marketing, unclicking is often required for a user to avoid being billed automatically for unnecessary services, sometimes part of a deceptive business practice termed negative option billing. A user's Facebook privacy settings have often been chosen in advance by Facebook Inc., which presumes that a user would like particular settings, and to un-choose these options, a user may need to unclick or opt-out of the Facebook-determined choices by finding the right menus. According to behavioral economics, computer and Internet users have a general tendency to go along with a default setting.

== Other contexts ==
The term unclick has also been used in other contexts, such as when there is a latching or locking mechanism, such as a lock on a briefcase, or seat belts in a car or airplane, or door lock, or other mechanisms which typically make a "clicking" sound. In these contexts, unclicking means to open the latch or seat belt. It has also been used in the context of guns, in which a safety catch is "unclicked", or flooring materials in which pieces are interlocked, The term has been used to describe the act of answering a cell phone by pressing on a button when it is ringing.
