= Frame (GUI) =

A frame, or group box, is a type of box within which a collection of graphical control elements can be grouped as a way to show relationships visually, either because the items are functionally related (such as a radio button), or because they apply to related objects.

In HTML (where frame has another meaning, referring to an individually scrollable portion of a page), this kind of grouping box is called a fieldset after the HTML element of the same name.

In the adjacent image, the top frame has no title. The two frames below have titles, and a radio button outside them, presumably to select one or the other. The lower of the two boxes is dimmed, or disabled, indicating its widgets cannot be selected. Each of the frames (as well as the area outside of the frames) has a checked radio button, while normally only one of the buttons can be selected.

Any widget, such as nested frames, can be placed inside of a frame, not merely radio buttons.
