= H. Gordon Payrow Jr. =

American politician (1918–2004)

Mayor Gordon Payrow

5th Mayor of Bethlehem
- In office 1962–1974
- Preceded by: Earl E. Schaffer
- Succeeded by: Gordon Mowrer

Bethlehem City Councilmen
- In office 1952–1962

Personal details
- Born: February 4, 1918
- Died: April 13, 2004 (aged 86)
- Party: Republican
- Spouse: Dorothy Parker
- Education: Lehigh University

Harry Gordon Payrow Jr. (February 4, 1918 – April 13, 2004) was an American politician who served as mayor of Bethlehem, Pennsylvania for 12 years from 1962 to 1974. He served as the city's first strong mayor and during his tenure he dedicated himself to revitalizing the city with the construction of the City Center and the Fahy Bridge.

== Early life ==
Born to Harry and Ida Payrow, Gordon was a Bethlehem native and lifelong resident. He attended Bethlehem High School and the Allentown Preparatory school and went on to study business at Lehigh University.

== Career ==
=== Bethlehem city councilmen ===
Payrow's political career started when he was elected to the Bethlehem City Council in 1952 as a Republican in a predominantly Democratic city. He would hold the office until his election as mayor in 1962.

=== Mayor of Bethlehem ===
Payrow would be elected the 5th mayor of Bethlehem in 1962. He would be the city's first Strong-mayor meaning he was the first mayor that could directly interact with the lawmaking process in the city. One of his most lasting achievements was the construction of the Civic center. However, the funding for the center was rejected in a referendum. He would subvert these results through the city council and build the center regardless. He also oversaw the creation of the Fahy Bridge. His massive renovation projects in the downtown impacted the entire city's day-to-day life as well as reshaping the entire city for generations to come. He also started the Bathlehem Area Jaycees and was their primary sponsor. He decided not to seek a fourth term and retired in 1974.

=== Post-mayoral career ===
After retiring as mayor, Payrow worked as senior vice president of First Valley Bank while also serving on various boards and community organizations. He also wrote numerous letters to the editor about Bethlehem issues to The Morning Call. The city center he fought to build was renamed in his honor as well as having a park and post office bearing his name.

== Personal life ==
Payrow married Dorothy Parker in 1943 although despite their 61 years of marriage they had no children. He was a lifelong member of the Methodist church and had a sister named Miriam Burkhard.
