= Earl E. Schaffer =

American politician

Mayor Earl E. Schaffer

4th Mayor of Bethlehem, Pennsylvania
- In office 1950–1962
- Preceded by: Robert Pfeifle
- Succeeded by: H. Gordon Payrow, Jr.

Personal details
- Born: 1903
- Died: 1982 (aged 78–79)
- Party: Democratic
- Children: Carolyn Wolf

Earl E. Schaffer was an American politician who served as Democratic mayor of Bethlehem, Pennsylvania for 12 years between 1950 and 1962. During his time as mayor he greatly expanded the city's recreational centers and renovated the municipal government building. He also proposed legislation that would eventually culminate in Bethlehem implementing a strong mayor system of government.

== Political career ==
=== Before mayoralship ===
Before being elected as mayor, Earl Schaffer served as clerk-secretary to superintendent of schools in Bethlehem from 1919 to 1923, as treasurer for the Bethlehem City School District from 1923 to 1939, as the school tax collector in 1931 and as the delinquent school tax collector from 1932 to 1939.

=== Mayor of Bethlehem ===
Schaffer was elected mayor in 1950. During his time in office he proposed the creation of a new city hall complex, oversaw the construction of a new sewer plant, and the building of the Penn Forest Dam and Reservoir. He also created the Bethlehem Redevelopment Authority and introduced legislation that would create a strong-mayor system of government in the city with his successor, H. Gordon Payrow, Jr., being elected simultaneously with a plebiscite to implement the strong mayor system. During his time as mayor Schaffer would be engaged in the local Roman Catholic Church, giving a speech at a mass alongside Atlanta bishop Francis Edward Hyland applauding the continued growth of the Church in the south. As mayor, Schaffer also butted heads with Lehigh University on several occasions. Namely refusing to allow the university's sports teams from accessing public sports infrastructure such as ice rinks. Mayor Schaffer was also involved in the creation of the United States Civil Defense as he was present at the 1955 congressional subcommittee meeting outlining the network's operations and policies. Mayor Schaffer also received backlash due to his urban renewal efforts which saw him demolish many of the historic buildings in downtown Bethlehem to make way for new construction. Also, most of his public recreation redevelopment fell far below their expected usage. Namely the large municipal swimming pool and golf course had their expected attendance far below expected levels which has been attributed to the rise of television in the late 50's. Due to these attendance shortcomings and the costs required to create the recreational centers, Schaffer would be defeated in the Democratic primary during the 1952 election which ultimately saw Republican Payrow, Jr. take office. Most of the ideas that Schaffer introduced, namely the new city hall complex and the strong mayor government would be created during Payrow's term, with him getting most of the credit for their creation. However, due to his tireless efforts in increasing the towns recreational sports capabilities, the city's ice rink was named in his honor.

== Personal life ==
After leaving the office of mayor, Schaffer continued to serve as the executive director of Bethlehem Authority from 1963 to 1972, and again in 1975. His daughter, Carolyn Wolf, was recognized by the Phillipsburg, New Jersey center of commerce for her leadership role in down-syndrome advocacy and parent planning with her organization Project First Step to create a better network for parents with children with intellectual and developmental disabilities.
