= North American blizzard of 2003 =

Category 4 winter storm

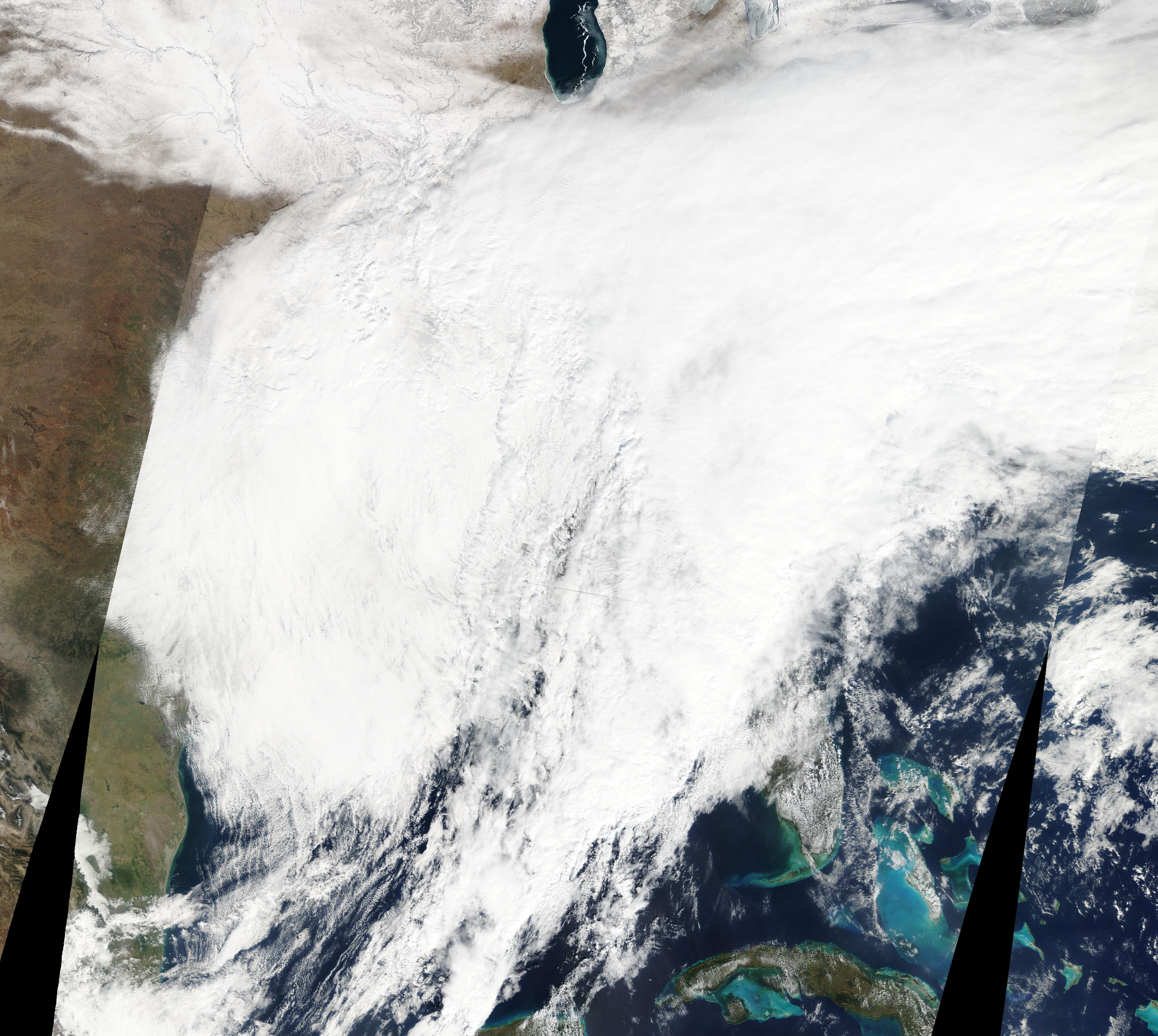
- The extratropical cyclone responsible for the blizzard as seen from the Aqua satellite

Meteorological history
- Formed: February 14, 2003
- Dissipated: February 22, 2003

Category 4 "Crippling" blizzard
- Regional snowfall index: 14.67 (NOAA)
- Lowest pressure: 1006 mbar (hPa); 29.71 inHg
- Max. snowfall: 44 in (110 cm) in Garrett County, Maryland

Tornado outbreak
- Tornadoes: 9
- Max. rating: F1 tornado

Overall effects
- Fatalities: 2 direct, 25 indirect
- Damage: Over $14.1 million
- Areas affected: Southern Rockies, Central United States, Eastern North America

The Blizzard of 2003, also known as the Presidents' Day Storm II or simply PDII, was a historic and record-breaking blizzard on the East Coast of the United States and Canada, which lasted from February 14 to February 19, 2003. It spread heavy snow across the major cities of the Northeastern and Mid-Atlantic states, making it the defining snowstorm of the very snowy winter of 2002–2003.

All cities from Washington, D.C. to Boston were covered in 15–30 inches (38–76 cm) of snow and those cities were brought to a standstill due to problems caused by temperatures and the snow. In Baltimore and Boston, this was the biggest snowstorm on record, with 28.2 and 27.5 inches (71.6 and 69.9 cm) respectively.

== Meteorological history ==
The severity of the Blizzard of 2003 can be attributed to the unusually favorable atmospheric conditions surrounding the storm (synoptic conditions). Most notably, the storm allowed for cyclogenesis off of the coastal Carolinas, a feature that is common to most major winter storms in the eastern parts of North America. This secondary system fed off the moisture of the Atlantic Ocean and enhanced precipitation totals from North Carolina to Massachusetts. Secondly, a high pressure system was in place over eastern portions of Canada, allowing for cold air to be brought down into the coastal areas in a process known as cold air advection. This cold air ensured that many areas where storms typically produce mixed precipitation received most or all precipitation in the form of snow.

The storm developed in the southern Rockies on February 14, and moved through southern Missouri and the Lower Tennessee Valley during the next few days. It brought heavy rain, ice and severe weather to some areas of the South, including the nation's first tornado of the year. Farther north, snow and ice affected the Midwest. Southern Iowa and eastern Illinois also got significant snow, with 11 inches (28 cm) in Des Moines. In central Kentucky the storm produced mostly ice, with some locations including Frankfort, Lexington, and nearby Cynthiana in Harrison County receiving up to 3/4" (2 cm) of ice. Much of Ohio received heavy snowfall, with Mansfield receiving 21 inches and Columbus receiving about a foot.

However, early on February 16, heavy snow started falling in those two cities, and the snow later developed in Philadelphia. Heavy snow was continuously reported, falling at rates of up to 4 inches (10 cm) per hour. In addition, temperatures were frigid, around 15 °F (-10 °C). The heavy snow continued all day, and it developed in New York City by the evening. At about the same time, the snow changed to sleet in Washington, D.C., and significantly lowered the accumulation. Throughout the rest of the Northeast, however, the snow continued for much of the night. The sleet changed back to snow by the next morning in Washington, D.C., and soon ended. By that time, a secondary low pressure system formed off the North Carolina coast and traveled north, turning the storm into a nor'easter for New York City and Boston. Blizzard Warnings were issued, and the snow began in Boston that day. In the evening, the heavy snow ended in New York City, and ended in Boston the morning of February 18. After that, the storm weakened and brought a few inches of snow to other parts of New England. The blizzard left the East Coast of the United States on February 19 and moved out into the North Atlantic Ocean. The storm weakened until it was completely absorbed by other systems on February 22.

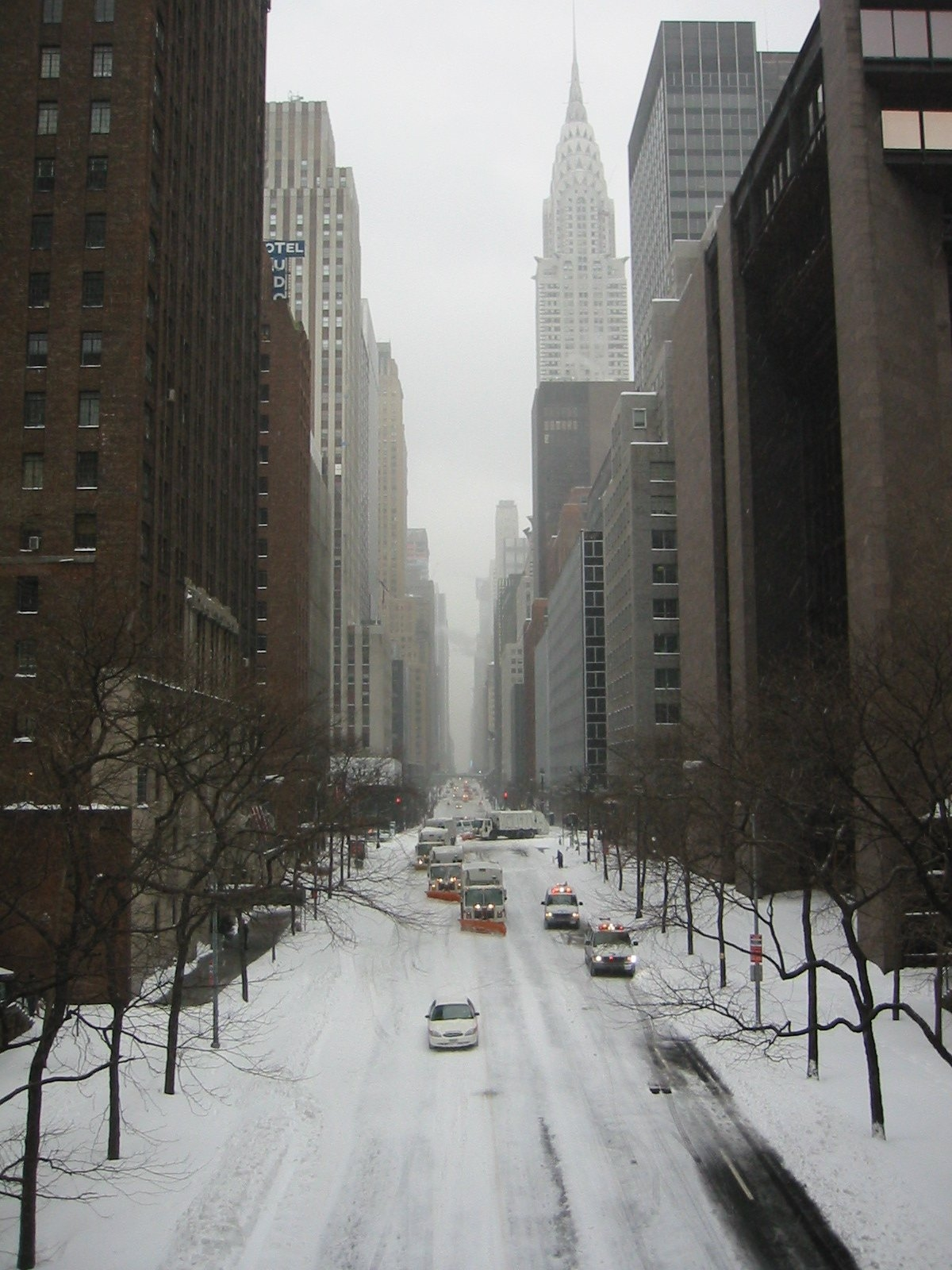
42nd street, NYC, near the UN, looking West during the February 2003 winter storm.

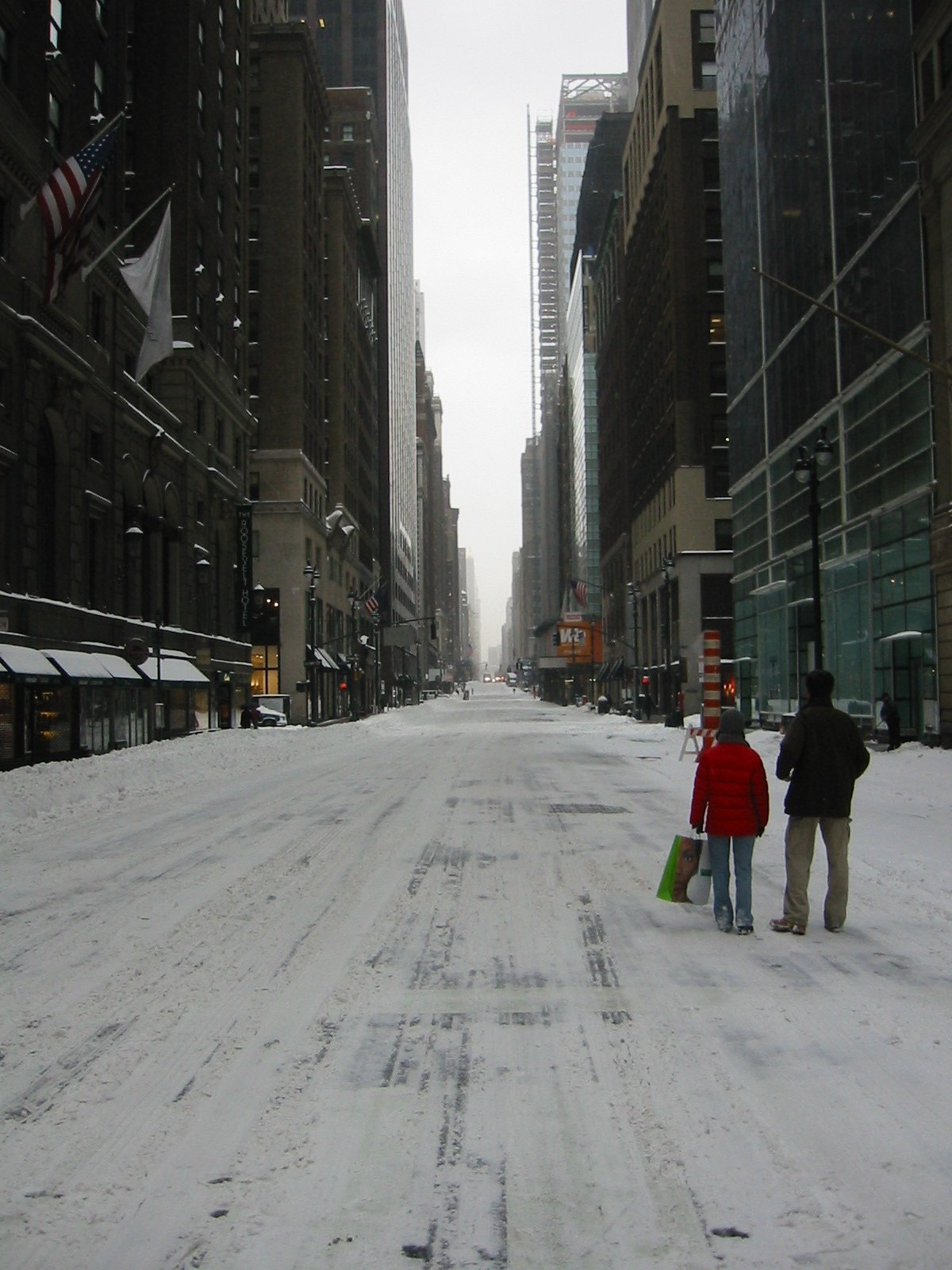
Madison Avenue, NYC, near Grand Central Terminal, looking South during the February 2003 winter storm.

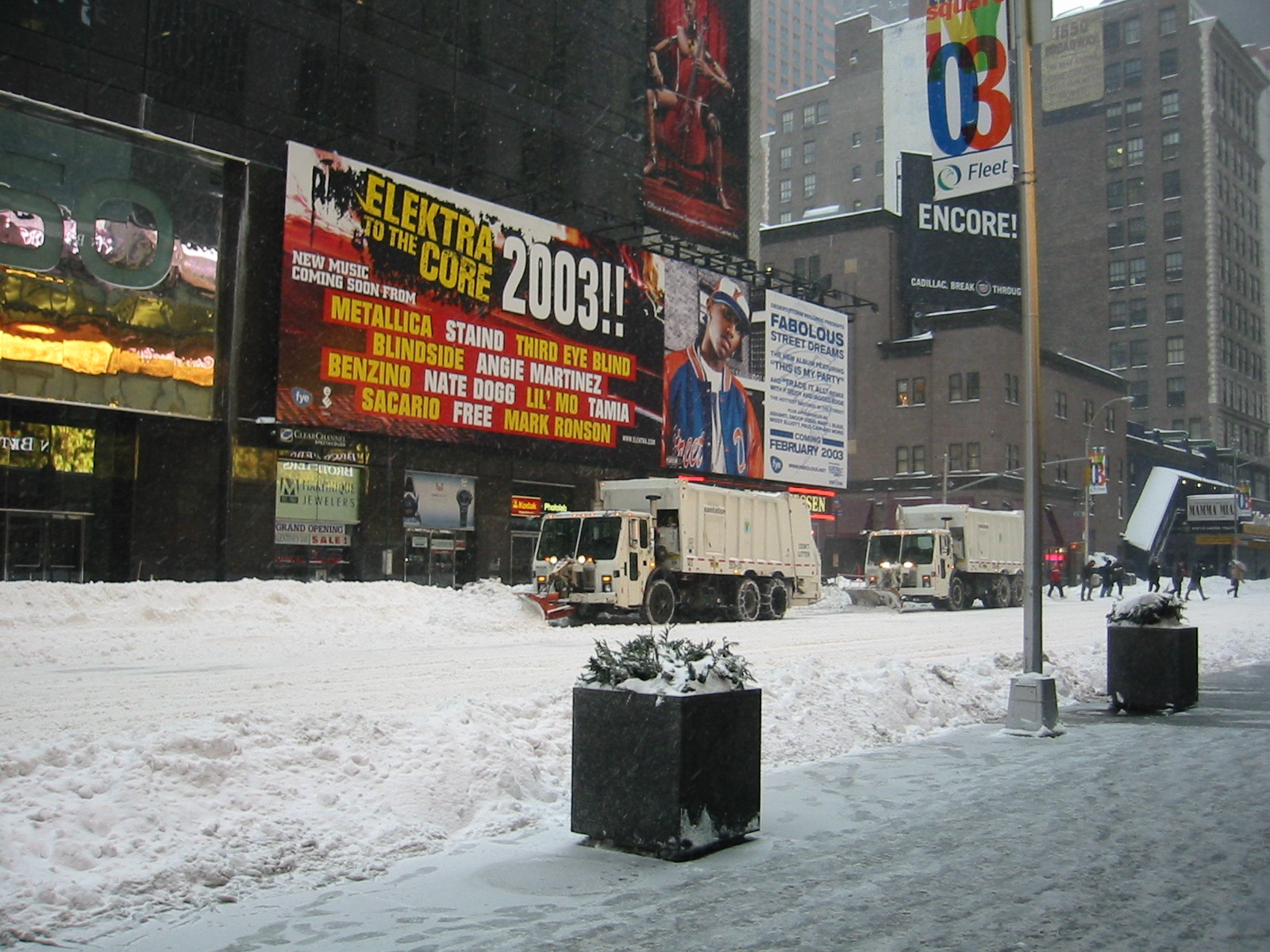
Times Square, NYC, during the February 2003 winter storm. Image shows the city garbage collection trucks outfitted with snow plows and scoops.

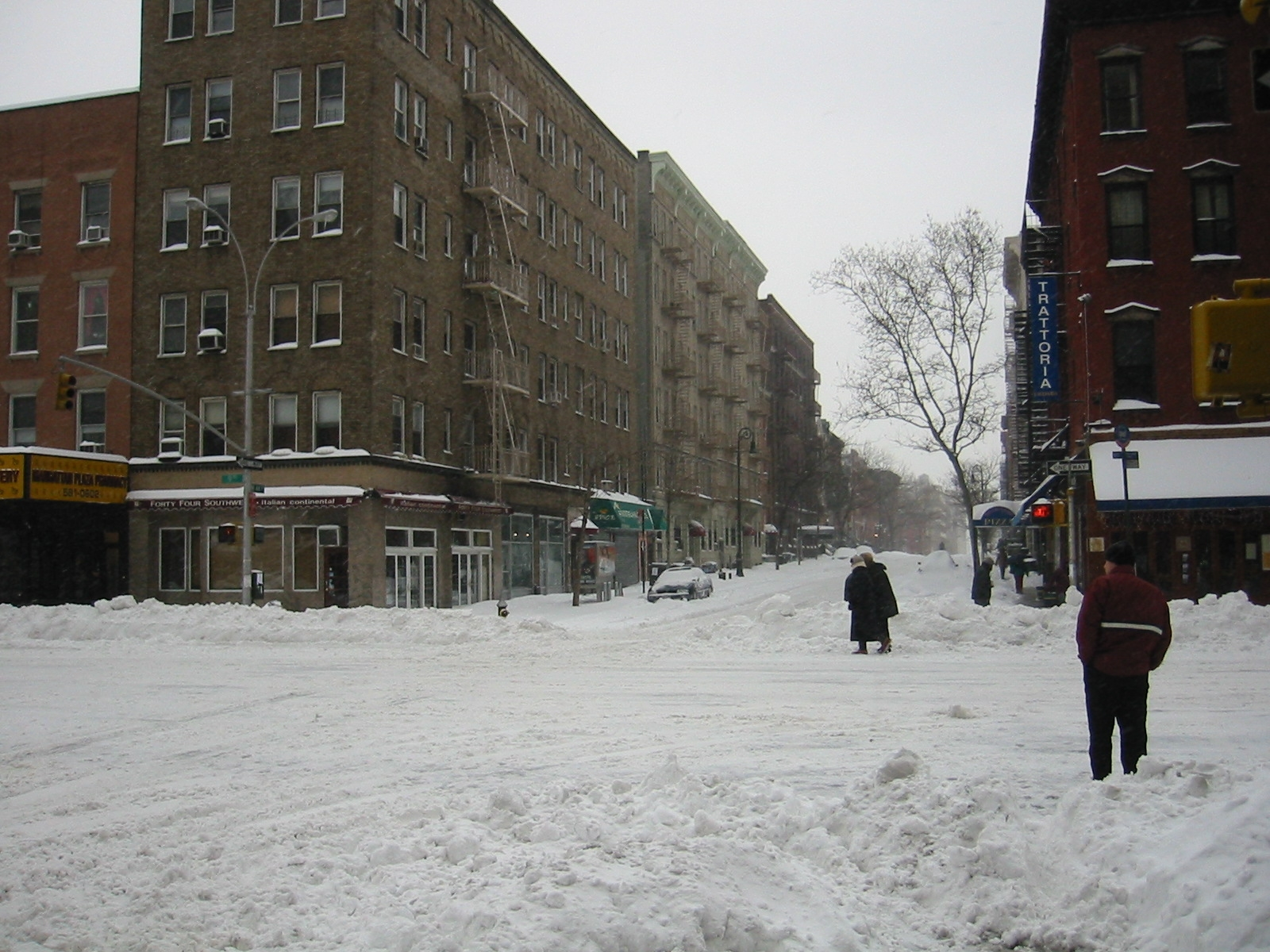
Corner in Hells Kitchen neighborhood, NYC, during the February 2003 winter storm.

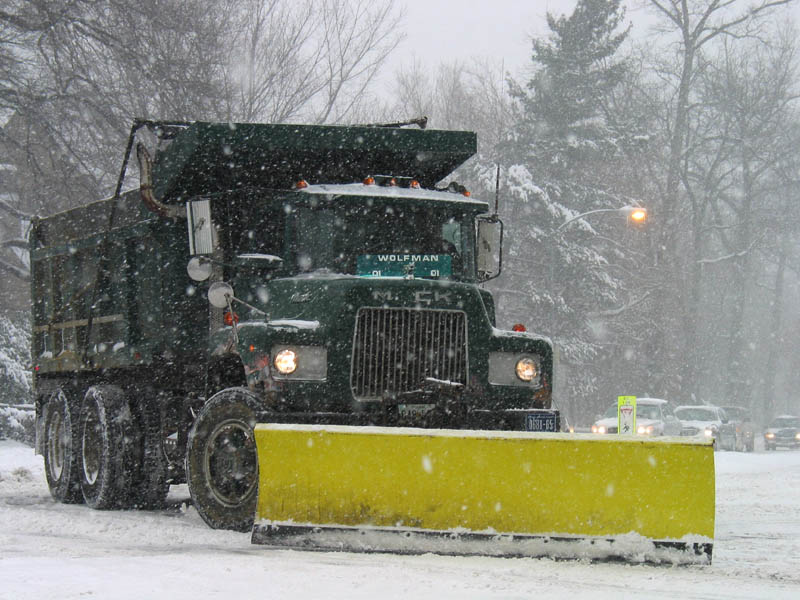
Plowing the streets of Washington, D.C. during the February 2003 winter storm.

== Impact ==
This snowstorm paralyzed much of the East Coast with its heavy snow. All in all, it was the most significant and powerful storm to affect the major cities of the Northeast since the Blizzard of 1996. Washington's Reagan National Airport, Baltimore/Washington International Airport, Pittsburgh International Airport, Philadelphia International Airport, and LaGuardia Airport in New York City were shut down completely, and Dulles Airport had one runway open. With snow continually accumulating, road travel was nearly impossible.

The B&O Railroad Museum in Baltimore on February 17, 2003, shortly after its roof collapsed

In Baltimore, the roof of the historic B&O Railroad Museum built in 1884 collapsed, damaging many valuable engines, historic railroad cars, and train exhibits. Although the structure's central support columns remained standing, the supporting iron struts and ties of the destroyed roofing sections failed under the heavy snow load. Some items in the museum's collection were damaged beyond repair. Reporting on the devastation the following day, The Baltimore Sun said, "...hours after the collapse, columns of mangled steel stuck out from the roundhouse ... Locomotives and passenger cars in the museum's collection, some dating from the 1830s, could be seen covered with snow and debris".

Parts of the Baltimore suburbs were some of the hardest hit areas of the blizzard. Snowfall totals in the towns immediately north of the city were estimated at between 38"-40" while the downtown city center recorded only 28" of snow. The difference in reported totals resulted in conflicting reports received by the Department of Transportation. This confusion in communications resulted in the towns with the highest amounts of snow receiving delayed assistance in the cleanup while the major roadways into and out of the city were cleared.

Most Washington, D.C. area television stations had wall-to-wall coverage from Saturday morning through Monday evening, only stopping briefly overnight. Even overnight, they had constant information bars on the screen with the latest forecasts and emergency information. The University of Maryland baseball team was stranded in Florida for an extra 3 days following a tournament at Stetson University due to all flights being canceled in the Baltimore/DC area. The city of Albany, New York was shut down for three days.

Many school districts affected by the blizzard closed schools for the week. The amount of snow accumulating on the roads forced some snowplows to plow the snow into parking lots, further contributing to school closures. Many schools announced during the storm that their facilities would be closed for the duration of the week following the storm. The University System of Maryland announced on Sunday, February 16 that their campuses would not reopen until Monday, February 24. The extended closure of school districts due to this storm exacerbated the task of scheduling make-up days for the affected students, as most of these districts had already used all of their previously allocated days on storms earlier in the winter. Some districts in New Jersey ended the school year as late as June 30, 2003.

In Pennsylvania, Governor Ed Rendell declared a state of emergency early on the 17th which made state agencies available for assistance. It also freed counties from spending restrictions and allowed routes to be closed to non-emergency vehicles. The state also issued a travel advisory asking people to stay off the roads. Many municipalities (including Philadelphia and Pittsburgh) declared their own snow emergencies which banned non-essential travel and parking on snow emergency routes. There were two snow-related deaths within Philadelphia. In the southeastern part of the state, area malls closed early on the 16th and churches cancelled services.

The weight of the snow caused several roof and porch collapses throughout the region, particularly around Philadelphia where the snow mixed with sleet. Most malls and shopping centers were closed on the 17th as many employees could not get to work. Funerals and elective surgical procedures were cancelled. Businesses, universities and government offices started to reopen on Tuesday the 18th, but most schools remained closed. Organizers had to postpone scheduled events. Even Girl Scouts could not deliver their cookies. Life returned closer to normal as the week continued. Volunteers helped hospital personnel get to and from work. Blood supplies though were down to about one day. Numerous accidents occurred in the southeast part of the state during the morning of the 16th.

After that, the timing of the storm (during the holiday weekend) kept the number of accidents and rescues down. The fluffy nature of the snow led to few power outages. Most were caused by vehicles crashing into utility poles. In Philadelphia, a partially buried man was found in a snowpile on the 17th. On the 21st, a 79-year-old woman was killed after a snow-packed aluminum patio roof collapsed on her. On the 19th, a 24-year-old man was injured when his leg was trapped under the debris of a porch collapse. The worst building collapse occurred in a warehouse near the old Navy Yard. Damage to the roof and goods was 3.5 million dollars. Philadelphia International Airport remained open on the 16th, but closed on the 17th and stranded about 600 passengers at the airport. The Greyhound bus terminal closed on the 17th.

SEPTA regional rail lines ran on weekend schedules through Tuesday the 18th. About 400,000 tons of snow were dumped into the Schuylkill River. The city estimated snow removal cost about 8 million dollars. It took until the 18th to plow side streets. The worst accident of the storm occurred early on the 16th as six vehicles collided near Academy Road on Interstate 95. In Delaware County, all trolley and bus routes were closed through the 18th as were schools and county offices. Snowmobiles were used to rescue trapped motorists. In Chester County, a major accident during the early afternoon of the 16th closed the eastbound lanes of the Pennsylvania Turnpike between Morgantown and Downingtown for three hours. In Montgomery County, in Conshohocken, two people were killed in an early morning fire on the 17th. Firefighters were hampered by the ongoing storm. Lengthy delays occurred on the 16th on U.S. Route 422, the Pennsylvania Turnpike and the Northeast Extension to the Pennsylvania Turnpike. A string of porch collapses occurred on the 19th in Norristown.

In Bucks County, a woman died of a heart attack. Emergency personnel could not reach her. The eastbound lanes of the Pennsylvania Turnpike near the Philadelphia Interchange were shut down during the afternoon of the 16th because of a multi-vehicle accident that set a couple of them ablaze. In Nockamixon and Bridgeton Townships, an avalanche closed a mile of River Road. Several drivers were stranded and had to be rescued. The snow was 10 feet high on the roadway. In the Lehigh Valley, even police cruisers were getting stuck in the snow. Non-four-wheel drive vehicles could not move. The Lehigh Valley International Airport remained opened, but most flights were canceled. There was no public transportation on the 17th.

The blizzard was part of a winter remarkable for its snowstorms in the affected states, where total snowfall for the season ranked in the top ten and even higher in some areas. In sections of the coastal northeast, 75 inches of total snowfall occurred that year. Some Maryland communities getting more than three feet of snow in the President's Day blizzard, such as Kingsville and Perry Hall, experienced more than 80 inches of snow for the entire winter season.

== Tornado outbreak ==
=== February 15 ===
List of confirmed tornadoes – Saturday, February 15, 2003 (Note: All dates are based on the local time zone where the tornado touched down; however, all times are in Coordinated Universal Time for consistency.)
F#	Location	County / Parish	State	Coord.	Date	Time (UTC)	Path length	Max width	Summary
F1	Delcambre	Vermilion	LA	29.95°N 92.00°W	February 15	17:00–17:02	0.5 mi (0.80 km)	10 yd (9.1 m)	A brief tornado impacted a mobile home park, lofting several trailers in the process. Four were destroyed, including one thrown 75 yd (69 m) onto a telephone pole and another onto a neighboring structure. One person was injured in the latter of these incidents. The trailer park suffered damage from Hurricane Lili just four months prior. Displaced residents were provided hotel stays and the local Red Cross chapter assisted them. During operational forecasts, radar signatures did not show indications of a tornado and showed winds no more than 30 mph (50 km/h).
F0	N of Puckett	Rankin	MS	32.13°N 89.78°W	February 15	22:20–22:22	1 mi (1.6 km)	50 yd (46 m)	A brief tornado damage the roofs of three chicken houses, uprooted trees, and snapped branches.
F0	E of Polkville	Smith, Scott	MS	32.18°N 89.60°W	February 15	22:43–22:53	3.5 mi (5.6 km)	75 yd (69 m)	A short-lived tornado touched down in the Bienville National Forest, causing damage to many trees along a narrow path. A few structures sustained roof damage.
F1	NW of Lawrence	Newton	MS	32.35°N 89.27°W	February 15	23:25–23:27	2 mi (3.2 km)	75 yd (69 m)	A mobile home was knocked off its foundation and the structure's porch was destroyed. Four chicken houses sustained major damage and hay barn had part of its roof torn off and thrown 0.25 mi (0.40 km) away. Numerous trees were also felled.
F1	NNW of Linden	Marengo	AL	32.33°N 87.82°W	February 15	02:36–02:40	2.5 mi (4.0 km)	80 yd (73 m)	This tornado occurred along the northern edge of a bow echo and impacted areas northwest of Providence. One home suffered significant damage while two mobile homes had minor damage. Numerous trees were blown down throughout Chickasaw State Park.

=== February 16 ===
List of confirmed tornadoes – Sunday, February 16, 2003
F#	Location	County / Parish	State	Coord.	Date	Time (UTC)	Path length	Max width	Summary
F1	Tyndall Air Force Base	Bay	FL	30.07°N 85.58°W	February 16	10:00	0.2 mi (0.32 km)	200 yd (180 m)	A waterspout moved onshore at the Tyndall Air Force Base, damaging more than thirty vehicles, one of which was thrown into a building.
F0	Vernon	Washington	FL	30.63°N 85.72°W	February 16	10:30	0.2 mi (0.32 km)	75 yd (69 m)	A brief tornado damaged several homes; trees and power lines were downed.
F0	Port St. Joe	Gulf	FL	29.82°N 85.30°W	February 16	12:37	0.2 mi (0.32 km)	75 yd (69 m)	A waterspout moved onshore in northern Port St. Joe and damaged a dozen homes. Many trees and power lines were downed.
F1	N of Cairo	Grady, Mitchell	GA	31.03°N 84.20°W	February 16	13:25–13:30	2.4 mi (3.9 km)	150 yd (140 m)	A tornado touched down near the Grady–Mitchell county line, damaging two homes in the area. Some grass was torn from the ground as well. In Mitchell County, three mobile homes were destroyed, three frame homes suffered major damage, and several others were impacted. One person suffered minor bruises.

== Other effects ==
This storm was part of the same system that caused that year's Daytona 500 to be rain-shortened. Michael Waltrip won the race.

== See also ==
- List of Regional Snowfall Index Category 4 winter storms
- December 2003 nor'easter
- March 2019 North American blizzard
- February 15–20, 2021 North American winter storm. A weaker Category 3 storm that happened almost exactly 18 years later.
