= Tick-box culture =

Bureaucratic and external impositions on professional working conditions

Tick-box culture or in U.S. English check-box culture, is described as bureaucratic and external impositions on professional working conditions, which can be found in many organizations around the world. Another related term is the culture of performativity.

== Origin ==
According to David Boyle, the tick-box culture emerged with the introduction of targets and key performance indicators in corporate governance and official bureaucracy; it resulted in overzealous focus on rules and regulations rather than issues and people. For Boyle, the tick-box culture is associated with dehumanized decision-making in organizational settings that manifests itself in the growth of management consulting, the pervasiveness of employee monitoring, and identity politics, among others.

Tick-box culture is studied as a contributing factor in a number of fields, such as education, criminal justice, management, and medicine.

== Fields ==
In social work, tick-box culture means there is too much emphasis on following rules instead of actually helping children.

In the US criminal justice system, some performance measures appear to have more influence on outcomes than others, and police targets have led to the criminalization of greater numbers of children, while goals for reduction youth in detention remain unmet. It was reported in 2011 that probation officers in England spent 75% of their time on red tape, and the tick-box culture was blamed for the growth in bureaucracy. In Europe, crime prevention is thought to have shifted away from reducing opportunities for money laundering towards an emphasis on the demonstration of compliance with systems and procedures (tick-box culture) with the expectation that they will prevent money laundering from occurring.

Tick-box culture in medicine is seen as a system increasingly engineered to medical technicians rather than to professionals. In Scotland, a study found that clinical audit are perceived by practitioners as time-consuming and a managerially driven exercise with no associated professional rewards. For example, a hospital in England was investigated over the death of young woman who was being monitored by hospital staff, the tick-box culture was blamed in part for the woman's death.

== Criticism ==
Darren Mccabe, professor of organization studies at the University of Lancaster, wrote that "the shift towards a 'tick box' culture was a particular source of cynicism because it has created a shadowland where things are not as they seem or as they measured and represented." Other commentators also criticized a tick-the-box approach in the workplace and beyond.

In 2015, Theresa May stated that she wanted to stop the "tick box culture" of policing in England. The Daily Express blamed the tick-box culture for embarrassing incidents in the English health-care.

In England, in an effort to reduce formalistic, tick-box inspections of schools, official on-site examinations were greatly reduced and more emphasis was placed on professional judgement.

== See also ==
- Checkbox
- Organizational culture
