= Toggle switch (widget) =

Graphical user interface element

On/off states of GTK's toggle switch widget

A toggle switch is a graphical control element that allows the user to make a choice between two mutually exclusive states (such as on/off). Originally toggle switches were used primary in touchscreen-based user interfaces, but they have later become commonplace in desktop and web applications.

Toggle switches have a similar function as checkboxes, but unlike checkboxes, interacting with a toggle switch usually has an immediate effect on the application or system.

== Usability ==
An animated toggle switch widget, demonstrating the ambiguous state problem

Early research on touchscreen interfaces has identified usability issues with toggle switches. A common problem is ambiguous state indication: For example, does the label "on" indicate the current state of the switch or the resulting state after interacting with it?

Communicating affordance can also be difficult: for example should the user tap or slide the switch to change its state.
