= Inspector window =

The graphical control element inspector window is a type of dialog window that shows a list of the current attributes of a selected object and allows these parameters to be changed on the fly. A common use is in Integrated Development Environments, where the window shows the changing values of variables associated to an object during a debugging session.

Inspector windows show information in programs like file managers, showing file parameters like file size and access permissions.

For example, in a vector graphics application the user creates drawings out from elements such as lines, rectangles and circles. When such an element is selected on the page, an inspector will show the current size and absolute position on the page of this element with numbers. The user can then change those numbers to change the size or position of the object on the page.

An inspector window is a type of palette window.
