= Palette window =

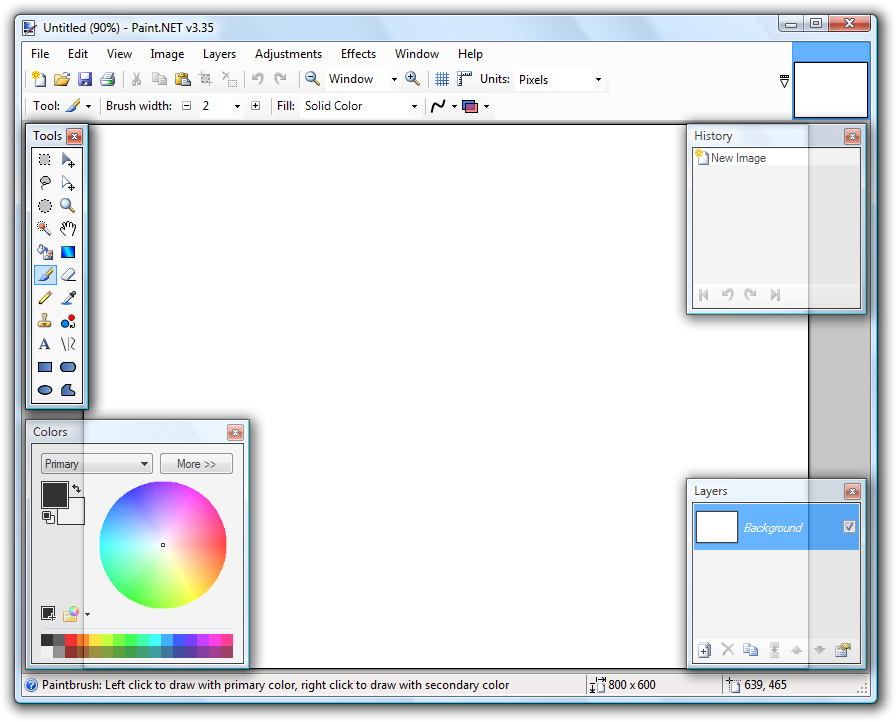
The default paint.net interface makes use of palette windows.

The graphical control element palette window, also known as utility window or floating palette, floats on top of all regular windows and offers ready access tools, commands or information for the current application.

Applications use palette windows to prevent toolbar clutter. While toolbars and ribbons are typically horizontal, locked to window or screen borders, and of fixed length; palettes are usually scaled to fit their contents, movable, and vertical, consuming less of a computer's commonly landscape oriented screen space, and work better with multiple monitors.

Some palettes are standard and provided by the OS, reappearing in many applications, while other palettes are unique to each individual application. An example of a common application-specific palette window is an inspector window. On the Macintosh, palette windows are only visible while their parent application has focus. In a multiple document interface program, palettes are sometimes independent from the parent window.
