= Philip J. Fahy Memorial Bridge =

Phillip J. Fahy Memorial Bridge
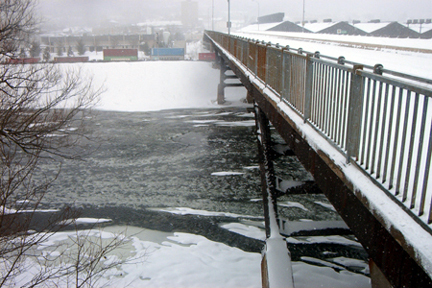
- Bridge during the President's Day Storm of 2003.
- Coordinates: 40°36′55″N 75°22′43″W
- Carries: 4 lanes of New Street (SR3011), 2 sidewalks
- Crosses: Lehigh River
- Locale: Bethlehem (Center City) to South Side Bethlehem
- Official name: Phillip J. Fahy Memorial Bridge
- Other name(s): Fahy Bridge; New Street Bridge

Characteristics
- Design: Steel rigid frame bridge
- Total length: 1,466 feet (447 m)
- Width: 55.1 feet (16.8 m) (deck width)

History
- Opened: 1972 (current structure)

The Philip J. Fahy Memorial Bridge is a bridge that crosses the Lehigh River in Bethlehem, Pennsylvania. It is locally known as The Fahy Bridge, The Fahy, or The New Street Bridge. It carries New Street in the city of Bethlehem (unsigned SR 3011) across the river.

== Naming ==
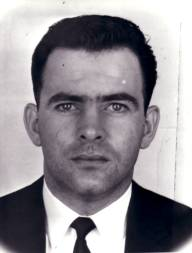
Police officer Philip J. Fahy for whom the bridge was named

On August 29, 1969, Officer Phillip Fahy and his partner Officer Merle Getz were on patrol when they attempted to stop a vehicle driven by a Bebley Wells. After pursuing the vehicle to an area off of the Williams St. Ext. Wells exited his vehicle and immediately fired a shotgun at Officer Fahy, mortally wounding him. Officer Getz was able to return fire, striking Wells several times.

Wells was later tried and convicted for the murder of Officer Fahy and died serving a life term for first degree murder in the Pennsylvania State Prison system in 2004. The bridge was named the Phillip J. Fahy Memorial Bridge in Officer Fahy's honor.

== History ==
There have been several bridges at this location since the late 19th century. The New Street Bridge Company owned one previous bridge; in 1915, it charged a toll of one cent for pedestrians, two cents for motorcycles, between five and fifteen cents for passenger cars, depending on the size and number of seats, and one-half cent per passenger carried over the bridge via streetcar. The bridge was replaced in 1970 with the current structure.

In 2011, the Pennsylvania Department of Transportation closed the sidewalk on the bridge following a bridge inspection that discovered structural deterioration in the steel- supported sidewalk and the concrete sidewalk itself.

In 2016, a rehabilitation project was undertaken on the bridge.

In 2024, after winning the 160th meeting of The Rivalry, Lehigh students tore down the goal posts at Goodman Stadium and marched them over 4 miles and over South Mountain to throw them into the Lehigh River at Fahy bridge.
