= The Rivalry (Lafayette–Lehigh) =

American college football rivalry

- Lafayette Leopards Lehigh Mountain Hawks
- Sport: Football
- First meeting: October 25, 1884; Lafayette 56, Lehigh 0
- Latest meeting: November 21, 2026; Lehigh 51, Lafayette 48^{OT}
- Next meeting: November 20, 2027

Statistics
- Total meetings: 162 (most in college football)
- All-time series: Lafayette: 82–75–5
- Largest victory: Lehigh: 78–0 (1917)
- Longest win streak: Lafayette: 10 (1919–1928)
- Current win streak: Lehigh: 3 (2024–present)

Locations in Lehigh Valley

The Rivalry is an American college football rivalry game played annually between the Patriot League teams: the Lafayette Leopards football of Lafayette College and the Lehigh Mountain Hawks football of Lehigh University. It is the most-played football rivalry in the nation and is the longest uninterrupted rivalry game.

As of 2025, The Rivalry has been played 161 times since 1884 with only two interruptions, one in 1896 due to a dispute over a Lafayette player also playing professional baseball, and in 2020 due to COVID-19 issues. The colleges' football teams met twice annually until 1901 (except 1891, when they played three games, and 1896, when they did not play at all). The two institutions are located seventeen miles apart in the Lehigh Valley in eastern Pennsylvania.

Despite popular belief, Harvard and Yale did not play The Game in four separate years during The Rivalry's streak of 159 consecutive games. Furthermore, Lehigh and Lafayette met twice per season in 1943 and 1944 during World War II. The Rivalry is so old that it predates football trophies; the winning team instead keeps the game ball. These are painted with the score and kept at the winning institution's campus. Lehigh displays its game balls in its athletic hall of fame, and Lafayette keeps its game balls at the official residence of its president. The evolution of the shape of the football can be seen in the displays of past game balls, since the early ones predate even the invention of the forward pass.

The game has inspired books and a PBS television documentary narrated by Harry Kalas. In 2006, ESPNU ranked The Rivalry No. 8 in their Top Ten College Football Rivalries, and Sports Illustrated has told its readers that seeing it "is something you have to do once in your life." In 2018, The Rivalry was ranked among Athlon Sports top 25 rivalries in the history of college football.

The 150th game, on November 22, 2014, was played at Yankee Stadium in New York City. The game was broadcast live nationally on CBS Sports Network.

== Series history ==
=== Early days ===
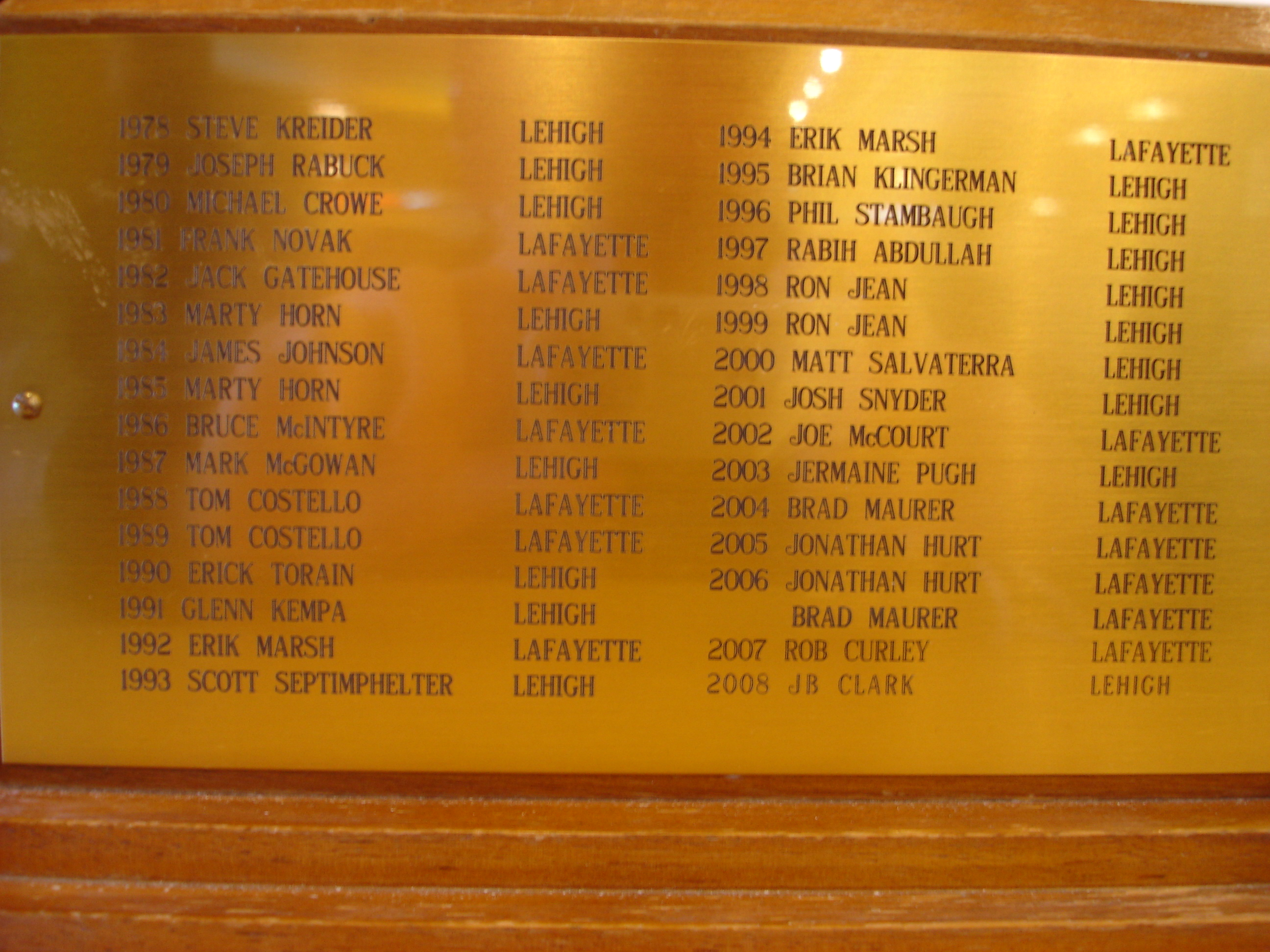
The Lafayette–Lehigh MVP Trophy plaque in February 2011

Although they did not meet on the football field until 1884, an anecdote from David Bishop Skillman's history of Lafayette College reveals that bad blood existed between the two places even before Lehigh University was founded. When Asa Packer first moved to Mauch Chunk in present-day Jim Thorpe, Pennsylvania as an uneducated carpenter, he followed his family's footsteps in joining a local Presbyterian church. However, he did not fit in well with the other more strait-laced members of the congregation, and so he left and joined an Episcopalian congregation that was more welcoming to him.

After Packer had risen to affluence and before he founded Lehigh University, Ario Pardee, a coal baron from Hazleton, approached Judge Packer in connection with the addition of an engineering wing to Lafayette College. While eager at first in the proposition, Packer's enthusiasm turned sour when Pardee mentioned that the school would be under the control of the Presbyterian Church. Packer let him know that he would have nothing to do with any school run by the Presbyterians. Packer later enlisted the help of the Episcopal Bishop of Philadelphia, William Bacon Stevens, in founding Lehigh University.

=== First athletic events ===
Lafayette records indicate that the first athletic meeting between the two schools was a series of baseball games played in Easton and Bethlehem in October 1869. The first game was a 45–45 tie, and Lafayette won the second meeting 31–24.

The first joint athletic track and field event held between the two institutions was on May 14, 1881, on the grounds of Lehigh University. The meet consisted of fourteen events: a 100-yard dash, a half-mile run, a hammer throw, high jump, 440-yards dash, mile walk, shotput, broad jump, 220-yard dash, mile run, pole vaulting, 120-yard hurdle race, bicycle race, a standing high jump, and tug of war. Lehigh won the event decisively, winning ten of the fourteen events.

As a sign of the intense rivalry that was already developing between the two schools, an article in Lafayette's student newspaper, the Lafayette College Journal, called Lafayette's loss to Lehigh a "defeat in our recent contest with Lehigh University, -a defeat, too, doubly humiliating, coming, as it did, from an adversary in every other respect our inferior."

=== Early football ===
Lafayette football began in 1882. The game was closer to rugby back then and even the goals and touchdowns were recorded separately in the scores. After football rules were standardized in 1883, Lafayette's manager Theodore L. Welles approached Lehigh and offered to play them. Lehigh thus formed its first team in 1884, managed by Richard Harding Davis, which gamely played and lost twice to the more experienced Lafayette team.

The Lehigh freshmen were dismayed by the lack of support that the administration showed the team. They thought the rickety stands built for the 1887 event in Bethlehem were a disgrace and set them on fire at the end of the game to celebrate Lehigh's first win. Thus, the tradition of exuberance surrounding the game was started.

Since the start in 1884, only in one season (1896) have the teams not met. Because few schools were playing football at the time and travel was more difficult in the horse and buggy era, Lehigh and Lafayette played each other twice in the early years with each school hosting one of the games. This continued until the development of modern football in 1902, when the current annual game was established.

Only twice have Lafayette and Lehigh played somewhere other than in Easton or Bethlehem. In 1891, the teams played a third game in Wilkes-Barre, before 3,000 spectators. A newspaper report stated: "... by far the largest crowd that ever witnessed a football game in Wilkes-Barre, and the cheering of the students seemed to startle the natives." That was one of three Lafayette-Lehigh games that year; Lehigh won all three. The next meeting outside the Lehigh Valley did not take place until 2014, when the schools played at Yankee Stadium to commemorate the 150th game in the series.

=== 20th century ===
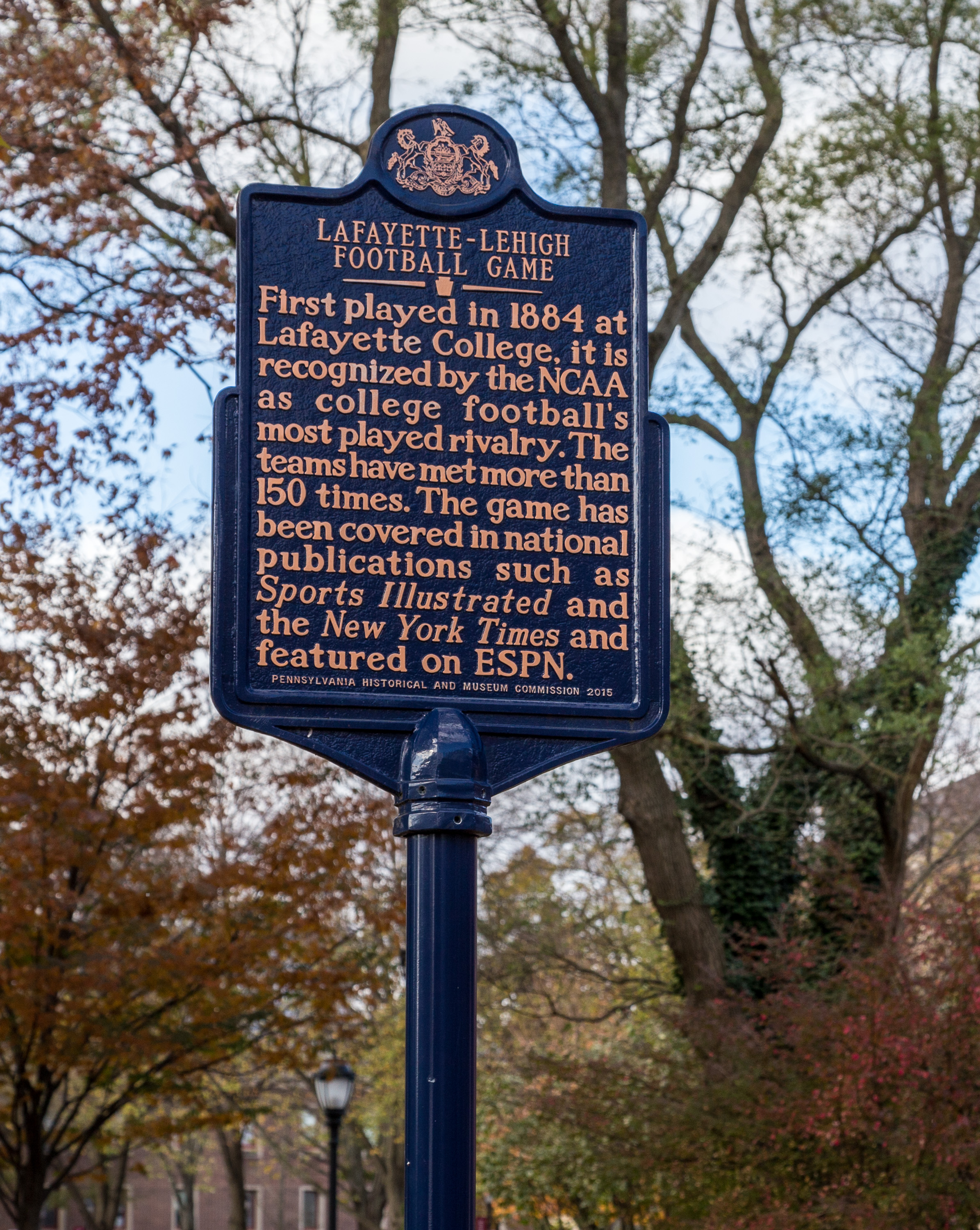
A plaque on the Lafayette College campus in Easton commemorating The Rivalry

The Rivalry's football game was postponed only twice during the 20th century. The first postponement occurred in 1904 because of the death of Dr. Henry S. Drown, president of Lehigh and former faculty member at Lafayette. The only other postponement was in 1963 when the game was moved from November 23 to 30 following the assassination of President John F. Kennedy.

During World War II, the war restricted travel to other opponents and Lehigh was hosting officer training programs which limited sports programs. Thus, to fill out their schedules, the nearby schools played two football games again in 1943 and 1944, with Lehigh students forming ad hoc teams just to keep The Rivalry tradition alive. Between November 1943 and November 1947, Lafayette won six games in a row by a combined score of 193–0, but by the early 1950s Lehigh was winning in lopsided shutouts.

The combination of only missing one year of play since 1884, plus 19 years with two games and one year with three, has led to The Rivalry becoming the most played in college football.

Prior to 1991, when new rules and game start times were imposed, it was traditional for the fans to tear down the temporary wooden goalposts that the schools erected for the event. The pieces were kept as souvenirs in the fraternities of each school. Eventually, taking down the goalposts got out of hand with students fighting for the torn down goal posts, and with each other, as early as before the third quarter. New rules were implemented for the 1991 game played at Lehigh when H-shaped steel goalposts anchored 10 feet into the ground were first used. The fans who rushed the field were frustrated by the new changes and showed this by tearing up and throwing pieces of sod at the security guards and police who were surrounding the posts. Only one fan actually was able to climb the posts, and when he was pulled down, he was maced and handcuffed.

=== 21st century ===
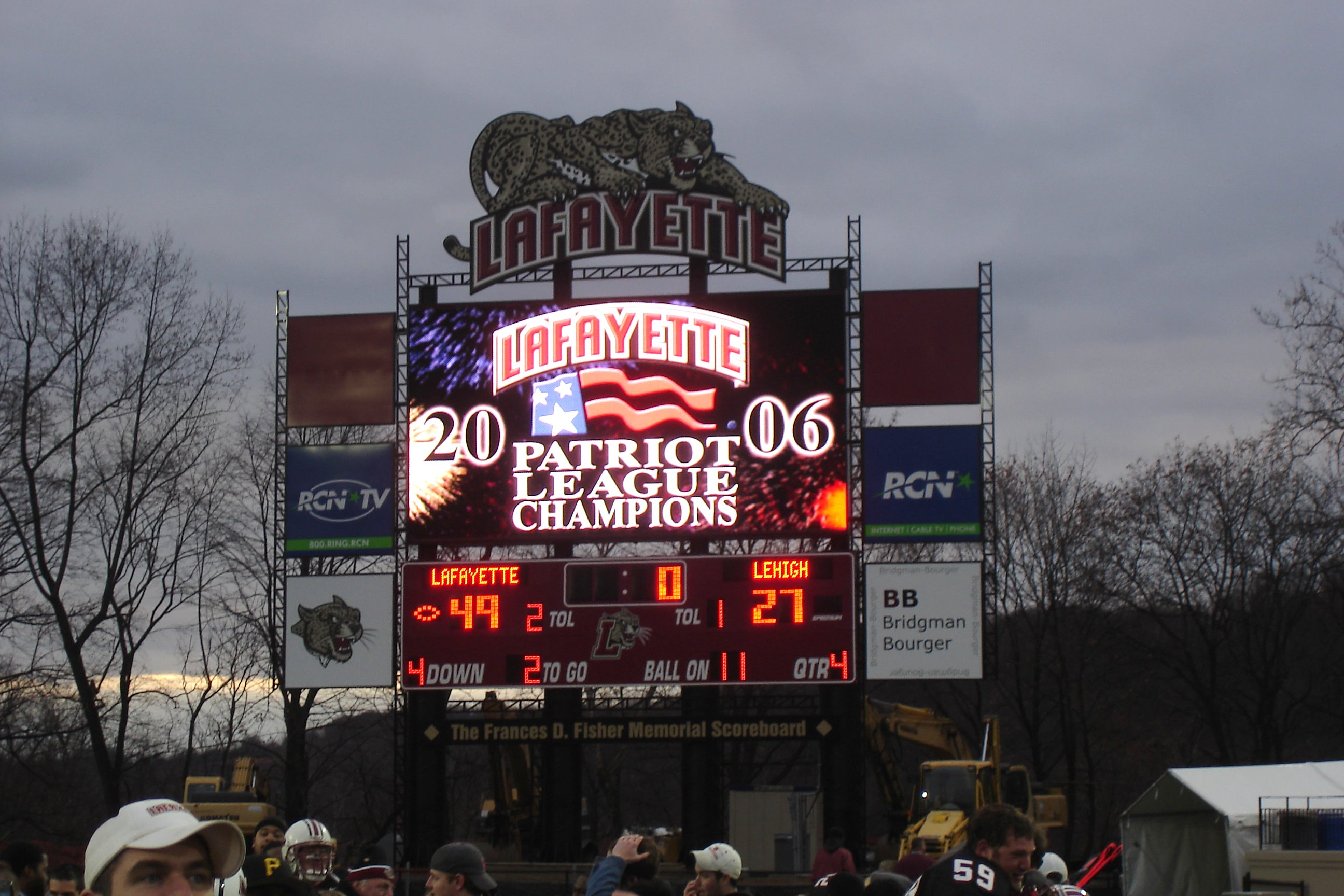
Fisher Stadium's scoreboard in Easton following Lafayette College's victory over Lehigh in the 142nd edition of "The Rivalry" in 2006

Starting in the 2000s, the regular season ending game has often become a factor in deciding the winner of the Patriot League. During the 2004 and 2006 meetings, Lehigh came into Fisher Stadium leading Lafayette by one game. Due to tie breaking rules, the winner of the game would be crowned the League champion. The second runner-up during this period was Colgate University, which had beaten Lafayette or Lehigh that year.

Following nine years of consecutive Lehigh victories, Lafayette earned a four-year parade of Lafayette victories from 2004 to 2007 wherein the Lehigh Class of 2008 witnessed no football victory against Lafayette at all. This was then reversed by Lehigh, with Lehigh running a five-year streak from 2008 to 2012, making the Lafayette Classes of 2012 and 2013 winless. The tide changed in 2013, when, for the first time since 2006, The Rivalry was played with a Patriot League championship on the line. Much like in 2006, the Leopards jumped out to a large lead, fought off a Lehigh rally, and pulled away down the stretch, winning 50-28 and claiming the Patriot League crown outright, this time on their rival's home turf. Quarterback Drew Reed took MVP honors, becoming the first Lafayette freshman in almost 25 years to do so.

==== 150th meeting ====
The 150th meeting of The Rivalry took place in 2014 at Yankee Stadium in the Bronx. While this was the first neutral-site game in more than a century, Lafayette was the designated home team. The stadium was much larger than either school's regular venue, and likely larger than any venue where all but a tiny number of players from either side would ever play. Each team debuted special uniforms with Lafayette sporting a plain gray jersey, while Lehigh paid tribute to the stadium and usual home team by sporting a pinstripe jersey.

While Lafayette had won the last meeting, and had a slightly better record than their competitor, Lehigh's chances were vastly improved as Lafayette's starting and backup quarterbacks were injured in the previous game and in practice respectively, leaving third string senior Zach Zweizig to lead the team. Lafayette still won, defeating Lehigh 27–7.

==== COVID-19 postponement ====
The game was originally canceled in 2020 for the first time in 124 years due to the COVID-19 pandemic and the cancellation of fall sports by the Patriot League. A decision was later made to move the Patriot League fall 2020 season to spring 2021, thereby allowing the Rivalry to remain uninterrupted in the school calendar year. Lafayette and Lehigh were originally scheduled to play on April 3, but the game was postponed due to COVID-19 issues within the Lafayette program. The teams eventually played on April 10, with Lafayette winning 20–13.

==== Schedule deviation ====
The two schools announced on May 25, 2023, that the venues for the games in 2024 and 2025 were swapped. Lehigh hosted the matches in 2023 and 2024, with the contests moving to Lafayette in 2025 and 2026. The change was to accommodate Lafayette's bicentennial celebration in the 2025–26 academic year in honor of the school's 1826 founding. The Rivalry will revert to its regular venue schedule in 2027.

== Memorable moments ==
=== No game in 1896 ===
The only season, and first calendar year, in which there was no game was 1896, when Lehigh refused to play Lafayette over a dispute about the eligibility of their best running back, George Barclay, who had played professional baseball at Chambersburg, Pennsylvania, the previous summer. The question of his eligibility centered around whether Barclay had received more than reimbursement of travel expenses.

=== Longest run in 1918 ===
During a 17–0 Lehigh victory in 1918, it is rumored that Lehigh halfback Raymond B. "Snooks" Dowd ran 115 yards for a touchdown. As Lehigh Athletic Media Relations relate the story, "Dowd ran the wrong way, circled his own goalposts," and then ran the length of the field for the touchdown eluding Lafayette's All-American linebacker Zac "Baker" Howes in the process. Some reports have been exaggerated to credit the length of the run to as much as 160 yards.

=== Overtime catch in 1995 ===
In the 1995 game, the first year in which the Patriot League used overtime, the game was decided in the second overtime session. Following a 30–30 regulation score and a scoreless first possession of overtime, Lehigh wide receiver Brian Klingerman caught a pass with one hand from quarterback Bob Aylsworth in the back of the end zone. The catch not only won the game for Lehigh, which trailed 30–14 midway in the fourth quarter, but led them to clinch the Patriot League championship.

=== Lafayette's catch in 2005 ===
In the 2005 game played at Lehigh, Lafayette backup quarterback Pat Davis threw a 37-yard TD pass to running back Jonathan Hurt on 4th-and-10 with 38 seconds left to give the Leopards a 23–19 win. The victory gave Lafayette the second of three straight Patriot League championships and NCAA Division I-AA (FCS) Playoff appearances. Davis entered the game after Lafayette starting quarterback Brad Maurer, the MVP of wins in 2004 (24–10) and later 2006 (49–27), was injured on the game's first series.

=== Lehigh's goalpost in 2024 ===
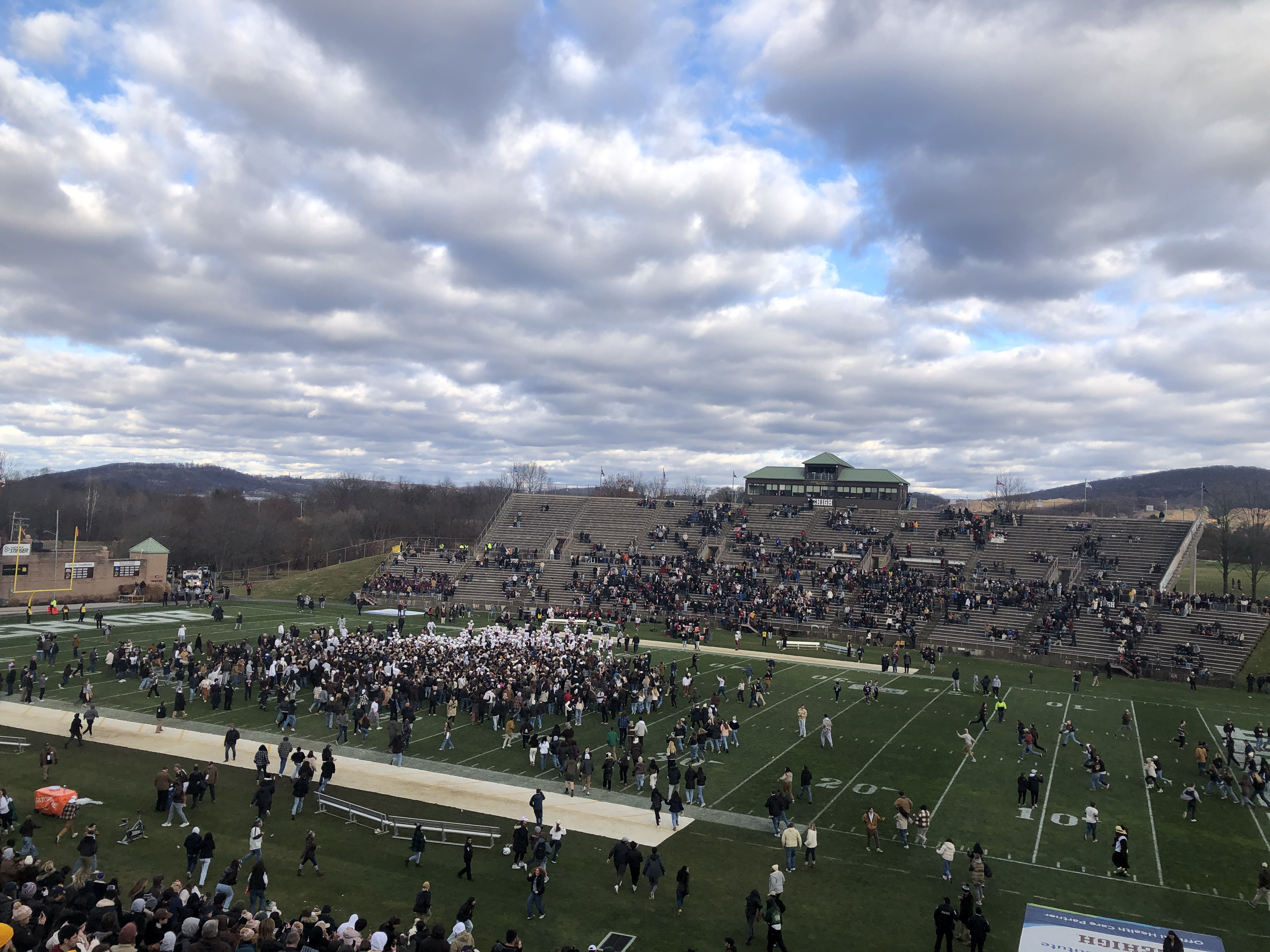
The aftermath of the 160th meeting of The Rivalry with Lehigh students storming the field after a win

In the 160th meeting played in 2024 Lehigh would defeat Lafayette 38–13 at home in front of a sellout 16,000 crowd, earning Lehigh its first winning season since 2016, and its 13th Patriot League championship and entry into the Division I FCS Playoffs. After the game ended, Lehigh students stormed the field and tore down a goalpost, marching it more than four miles over South Mountain to throw it into the Lehigh River at the Fahy bridge. This would be the first time that goalposts would come down at Lehigh since 1989. Tearing down the goal posts after a rivalry game had been a tradition at both schools with both institutions encouraging the act and making their goalposts out of wood to be easier to tear down until 1989 when Lafayette won at Bethlehem and a fight broke out between Lehigh fans attempting to defend their goal-posts, and Lafayette students attempting to tear them down, afterwards both schools agreed to make their goal posts out of reinforced steel with a concrete base to prevent future tear-downs. Despite this Lehigh students were still able to take down the metal goal-posts. Northampton County district attorney Stephen Baratta, a Lafayette alumnus, stated that the act constituted "criminal code violations" and that "this is not behavior that we can really sanction."

== Football record ==
=== Summary ===
162 meetings since 1884

Lafayette–Lehigh game results from 1884 to 2025
Games won by Lafayette	82
Games won by Lehigh	75
Games tied	5

== Game results ==
Lafayette victories	Lehigh victories	Tie games

No.	Date	Location	Winning team		Losing team	
1	October 25, 1884	Easton	Lafayette	56	Lehigh	0
2	November 12, 1884	Bethlehem	Lafayette	34	Lehigh	4
3	October 31, 1885	Bethlehem	Lafayette	6	Lehigh	0
4	November 21, 1885	Easton	Tie	6	Tie	6
5	November 6, 1886	Easton	Lafayette	12	Lehigh	0
6	November 24, 1886	Bethlehem	Lafayette	4	Lehigh	0
7	October 29, 1887	Bethlehem	Lehigh	10	Lafayette	4
8	November 23, 1887	Easton	Lafayette	6	Lehigh	0
9	November 17, 1888	Easton	Lehigh	6	Lafayette	4
10	November 27, 1888	Bethlehem	Lehigh	16	Lafayette	0
11	October 30, 1889	Bethlehem	Lehigh	16	Lafayette	10
12	November 16, 1889	Easton	Tie	6	Tie	6
13	November 1, 1890	Easton	Lehigh	30	Lafayette	0
14	November 15, 1890	Bethlehem	Lehigh	66	Lafayette	6
15	November 4, 1891	Bethlehem	Lehigh	22	Lafayette	4
16	November 11, 1891	Easton	Lehigh	6	Lafayette	2
17	November 25, 1891	Wilkes-Barre	Lehigh	16	Lafayette	2
18	November 5, 1892	Easton	Lafayette	4	Lehigh	0
19	November 19, 1892	Bethlehem	Lehigh	15	Lafayette	6
20	November 8, 1893	Bethlehem	Lehigh	22	Lafayette	6
21	November 18, 1893	Easton	Lehigh	10	Lafayette	0
22	November 14, 1894	Easton	Lafayette	28	Lehigh	0
23	November 24, 1894	Bethlehem	Lehigh	11	Lafayette	8
24	November 9, 1895	Bethlehem	Lafayette	22	Lehigh	12
25	November 23, 1895	Easton	Lafayette	14	Lehigh	0
26	October 30, 1897	Easton	Lafayette	34	Lehigh	0
27	November 25, 1897	Bethlehem	Lafayette	22	Lehigh	0
28	November 5, 1898	Bethlehem	Lehigh	22	Lafayette	0
29	November 24, 1898	Easton	Lafayette	11	Lehigh	5
30	November 4, 1899	Easton	Lafayette	17	Lehigh	0
31	November 25, 1899	Bethlehem	Lafayette	35	Lehigh	0
32	November 3, 1900	Bethlehem	Lafayette	34	Lehigh	0
33	November 24, 1900	Easton	Lafayette	18	Lehigh	0
34	November 1, 1901	Easton	Lafayette	29	Lehigh	0
35	November 23, 1901	Bethlehem	Lafayette	41	Lehigh	0
36	November 22, 1902	Easton	Lehigh	6	Lafayette	0
37	November 21, 1903	Bethlehem	Lehigh	12	Lafayette	6
38	November 24, 1904	Easton	Lafayette	40	Lehigh	6
39	November 15, 1905	Bethlehem	Lafayette	53	Lehigh	0
40	November 24, 1906	Easton	Lafayette	33	Lehigh	0
41	November 23, 1907	Bethlehem	Lafayette	22	Lehigh	5
42	November 21, 1908	Easton	Lehigh	11	Lafayette	5
43	November 20, 1909	Bethlehem	Lafayette	21	Lehigh	0
44	November 19, 1910	Easton	Lafayette	14	Lehigh	0
45	November 25, 1911	Bethlehem	Lafayette	11	Lehigh	0
46	November 23, 1912	Easton	Lehigh	10	Lafayette	0
47	November 22, 1913	Bethlehem	Lehigh	7	Lafayette	0
48	November 21, 1914	Easton	Lehigh	17	Lafayette	7
49	November 20, 1915	Bethlehem	Lafayette	35	Lehigh	6
50	November 25, 1916	Easton	Lehigh	16	Lafayette	0
51	November 24, 1917	Bethlehem	Lehigh	78	Lafayette	0
52	November 23, 1918	Easton	Lehigh	17	Lafayette	0
53	November 22, 1919	Bethlehem	Lafayette	10	Lehigh	6
54	November 20, 1920	Easton	Lafayette	27	Lehigh	7
55	November 19, 1921	Bethlehem	Lafayette	28	Lehigh	6
56	November 25, 1922	Easton	Lafayette	3	Lehigh	0
57	November 24, 1923	Bethlehem	Lafayette	13	Lehigh	3
58	November 22, 1924	Easton	Lafayette	7	Lehigh	0
59	November 21, 1925	Bethlehem	Lafayette	14	Lehigh	0
60	November 20, 1926	Easton	Lafayette	35	Lehigh	0
61	November 19, 1927	Bethlehem	Lafayette	43	Lehigh	0
62	November 24, 1928	Easton	Lafayette	38	Lehigh	14
63	November 23, 1929	Bethlehem	Lehigh	13	Lafayette	12
64	November 22, 1930	Easton	Lafayette	16	Lehigh	6
65	November 21, 1931	Bethlehem	Lafayette	13	Lehigh	7
66	November 19, 1932	Easton	Lafayette	25	Lehigh	6
67	November 25, 1933	Bethlehem	Lafayette	54	Lehigh	12
68	November 24, 1934	Easton	Lehigh	13	Lafayette	7
69	November 23, 1935	Bethlehem	Lehigh	48	Lafayette	0
70	November 21, 1936	Easton	Lehigh	18	Lafayette	0
71	November 20, 1937	Bethlehem	Lafayette	6	Lehigh	0
72	November 19, 1938	Easton	Lafayette	6	Lehigh	0
73	November 25, 1939	Bethlehem	Lafayette	29	Lehigh	13
74	November 23, 1940	Easton	Lafayette	46	Lehigh	0
75	November 22, 1941	Bethlehem	Lafayette	47	Lehigh	7
76	November 21, 1942	Easton	Tie	7	Tie	7
77	October 23, 1943	Easton	Lafayette	39	Lehigh	7
78	November 27, 1943	Bethlehem	Lafayette	58	Lehigh	0
79	October 21, 1944	Bethlehem	Lafayette	44	Lehigh	0
80	November 18, 1944	Easton	Lafayette	64	Lehigh	0
81	November 24, 1945	Bethlehem	Lafayette	7	Lehigh	0
82	November 23, 1946	Easton	Lafayette	13	Lehigh	0

No.	Date	Location	Winning team		Losing team	
83	November 22, 1947	Bethlehem	Lafayette	7	Lehigh	0
84	November 20, 1948	Easton	Lafayette	23	Lehigh	13
85	November 19, 1949	Bethlehem	Lafayette	21	Lehigh	12
86	November 18, 1950	Easton	Lehigh	38	Lafayette	0
87	November 17, 1951	Bethlehem	Lehigh	32	Lafayette	0
88	November 22, 1952	Easton	Lehigh	14	Lafayette	7
89	November 21, 1953	Bethlehem	Lafayette	33	Lehigh	13
90	November 20, 1954	Easton	Lafayette	46	Lehigh	0
91	November 19, 1955	Bethlehem	Lafayette	35	Lehigh	6
92	November 17, 1956	Easton	Lehigh	27	Lafayette	10
93	November 23, 1957	Bethlehem	Lehigh	26	Lafayette	13
94	November 22, 1958	Easton	Tie	14	Tie	14
95	November 21, 1959	Bethlehem	Lafayette	28	Lehigh	6
96	November 19, 1960	Easton	Lehigh	26	Lafayette	3
97	November 18, 1961	Bethlehem	Lehigh	17	Lafayette	14
98	November 17, 1962	Easton	Lehigh	13	Lafayette	6
99	November 30, 1963	Bethlehem	Lehigh	15	Lafayette	8
100	November 21, 1964	Easton	Tie	6	Tie	6
101	November 20, 1965	Bethlehem	Lehigh	20	Lafayette	14
102	November 19, 1966	Easton	Lafayette	16	Lehigh	0
103	November 18, 1967	Bethlehem	Lafayette	6	Lehigh	0
104	November 23, 1968	Easton	Lehigh	21	Lafayette	6
105	November 22, 1969	Bethlehem	Lehigh	36	Lafayette	19
106	November 21, 1970	Easton	Lafayette	31	Lehigh	28
107	November 20, 1971	Bethlehem	Lehigh	48	Lafayette	19
108	November 18, 1972	Easton	Lehigh	14	Lafayette	6
109	November 17, 1973	Bethlehem	Lehigh	45	Lafayette	13
110	November 23, 1974	Easton	Lehigh	57	Lafayette	7
111	November 22, 1975	Bethlehem	Lehigh	40	Lafayette	14
112	November 20, 1976	Easton	Lafayette	21	Lehigh	17
113	November 19, 1977	Bethlehem	Lehigh	35	Lafayette	17
114	November 18, 1978	Easton	Lehigh	23	Lafayette	15
115	November 17, 1979	Bethlehem	Lehigh	24	Lafayette	3
116	November 22, 1980	Easton	Lehigh	32	Lafayette	0
117	November 21, 1981	Bethlehem	Lafayette	10	Lehigh	3
118	November 20, 1982	Easton	Lafayette	34	Lehigh	6
119	November 19, 1983	Bethlehem	Lehigh	22	Lafayette	14
120	November 17, 1984	Easton	Lafayette	28	Lehigh	7
121	November 23, 1985	Bethlehem	Lehigh	24	Lafayette	19
122	November 22, 1986	Easton	Lafayette	28	Lehigh	23
123	November 21, 1987	Bethlehem	Lehigh	17	Lafayette	10
124	November 19, 1988	Easton	Lafayette	52	Lehigh	45
125	November 18, 1989	Bethlehem	Lafayette	36	Lehigh	21
126	November 17, 1990	Easton	Lehigh	35	Lafayette	14
127	November 23, 1991	Bethlehem	Lehigh	36	Lafayette	18
128	November 21, 1992	Easton	Lafayette	32	Lehgh	29
129	November 20, 1993	Bethlehem	Lehigh	39	Lafayette	14
130	November 19, 1994	Easton	Lafayette	54	Lehigh	20
131	November 18, 1995	Bethlehem	Lehigh	37	Lafayette	30
132	November 23, 1996	Easton	Lehigh	23	Lafayette	19
133	November 22, 1997	Bethlehem	Lehigh	43	Lafayette	31
134	November 21, 1998	Easton	Lehigh	31	Lafayette	7
135	November 20, 1999	Bethlehem	Lehigh	14	Lafayette	12
136	November 18, 2000	Easton	Lehigh	31	Lafayette	17
137	November 17, 2001	Bethlehem	Lehigh	41	Lafayette	6
138	November 23, 2002	Easton	Lafayette	14	Lehigh	7
139	November 22, 2003	Bethlehem	Lehigh	30	Lafayette	10
140	November 20, 2004	Easton	Lafayette	24	Lehigh	10
141	November 19, 2005	Bethlehem	Lafayette	23	Lehigh	19
142	November 18, 2006	Easton	Lafayette	49	Lehigh	27
143	November 17, 2007	Bethlehem	Lafayette	21	Lehigh	17
144	November 22, 2008	Easton	Lehigh	31	Lafayette	15
145	November 21, 2009	Bethlehem	Lehigh	27	Lafayette	21
146	November 20, 2010	Easton	Lehigh	20	Lafayette	13
147	November 19, 2011	Bethlehem	Lehigh	37	Lafayette	13
148	November 17, 2012	Easton	Lehigh	38	Lafayette	21
149	November 23, 2013	Bethlehem	Lafayette	50	Lehigh	28
150	November 22, 2014	The Bronx, NY	Lafayette	27	Lehigh	7
151	November 21, 2015	Bethlehem	Lehigh	49	Lafayette	35
152	November 19, 2016	Easton	Lehigh	45	Lafayette	21
153	November 18, 2017	Bethlehem	Lehigh	38	Lafayette	31
154	November 17, 2018	Easton	Lehigh	34	Lafayette	3
155	November 23, 2019	Bethlehem	Lafayette	17	Lehigh	16
156	April 10, 2021 (Note: November 21, 2020, game was postponed to April 10, 2021, due to the COVID-19 pandemic.)	Easton	Lafayette	20	Lehigh	13
157	November 20, 2021	Bethlehem	Lehigh	17	Lafayette	10
158	November 19, 2022	Easton	Lafayette	14	Lehigh	11
159	November 18, 2023	Bethlehem	Lafayette	49	Lehigh	21
160	November 23, 2024	Bethlehem	Lehigh	38	Lafayette	14
161	November 22, 2025	Easton	Lehigh	42	Lafayette	32
162	November 21, 2026	Easton	Lehigh	51	Lafayette	48^{OT}
Series: Lafayette leads 82–75–5

== All Sports Trophy ==
The Rivalry was further cemented by the creation of the "All Sports Trophy" in 1968. The trophy is held by the school which wins the most varsity sports meetings during a school year. One point is awarded per victory. At the year end, points are totaled to determine the overall champion.

=== All Sports Trophy record ===
Men's sports

- Years won by Lehigh – 34
- Years won by Lafayette – 2
- Ties – 6

Women's sports

- Years won by Lafayette – 12
- Years won by Lehigh – 10
- Ties – 0

== See also ==
- List of most-played college football series in NCAA Division I
- List of NCAA college football rivalry games
