= Combo box =

User interface element

A generic combo box

A combo box is a commonly used graphical user interface widget (or control). Traditionally, it is a combination of a drop-down list or list box and a single-line editable textbox, allowing the user to either type a value directly or select a value from the list. The term "combo box" is sometimes used to mean "drop-down list". In both Java and .NET, "combo box" is not a synonym for "drop-down list". Definition of "drop down list" is sometimes clarified with terms such as "non-editable combo box" (or something similar) to distinguish it from "combo box".

To make a combo box like shown in the image above in HTML, one can write the following code:

<input list="comboboxlist" value="Something else">

<datalist id="comboboxlist">
  <option value="List item 1">
  <option value="List item 2">
  <option value="List item 3">
  <option value="List item 4">
</datalist>

== See also ==
- Autocomplete
- Drop-down list
- List box
- User interface
