= Search suggest drop-down list =

Query feature used in computing

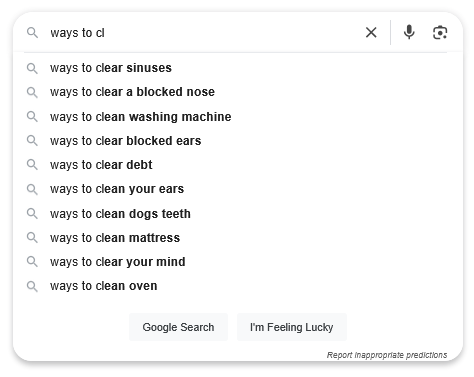
Autocomplete on a Google search where the user has typed "ways to cl"

Wikipedia's search box (Vector 2022 skin)

A search suggest drop-down list is a query feature used in computing to show the searcher shortcuts, while the query is typed into a text box. Before the query is complete, a drop-down list with the suggested completions appears to provide options to select. The suggested queries then enable the searcher to complete the required search quickly. As a form of autocompletion, the suggestion list is distinct from search history in that it attempts to be predictive even when the user is searching for the first time. Data may come from popular searches, sponsors, geographic location or other sources. These lists are used by operating systems, web browsers and various websites, particularly search engines. Search suggestions are common with a 2014 survey finding that over 80% of e-commerce websites included them.

The computing science of syntax and algorithms are used to form search results from a database. Content management systems and frequent searches can assist software engineers in optimizing more refined queries with methods of parameters and subroutines. Suggestions can be results for the current query or related queries by words, time and dates, categories and tags. The suggestion list may be reordered by other options, as enumerative, hierarchical or faceted.

Although not the first deployment of search suggestions, Google Suggest is one of the most prominent. Four years before it was considered stable, the feature was developed in 2004 by Google engineer Kevin Gibbs and the name was chosen by Marissa Mayer. Google, and other large search companies, maintain a blacklist that prevents the display of queries that could be interpreted as violating their social responsibility. Despite this, the company regularly receives complaints that several popular suggestions, or suggestions whose positions have been inflated by bots, should be added to this list. The Electronic Frontier Foundation's Jillian York has criticized Apple's blacklist for including words that are merely provocative.

One example of a project using suggested queries to expose societal attitudes was a 2013 ad series called The Autocomplete Truth by UN Women. The campaign showed several gender stereotypes being displayed as popular searches by Google Suggest. Another was a story by Bad Astronomy that revealed a distrustful perspective on scientists in the suggestion box. Additionally, cases related to libel laws have posited that suggestions may inspire people to associate specific names with specific alleged crimes when they would not have otherwise.

Some users have criticized the fact that suggestion-enabled text boxes, unlike the web forms of static HTML, send data about each keystroke to a central server. Such data has the potential to identify specific people. This has caused at least one Mozilla Firefox developer to opine that "users mostly dislike search suggestions". Apart from the privacy debate, some users have expressed negative reception over the usefulness of search autocompletion. Specifically, the sudden appearance of a suggestion box in some programs has been compared to the behaviour of a pop-up ad.

HTML supports this feature using the <datalist> element.

== See also ==
- Autocomplete
- Search engine (computing)
- Search box
- Search algorithm
- Censorship by Google § Search suggestions
