= Infobar =

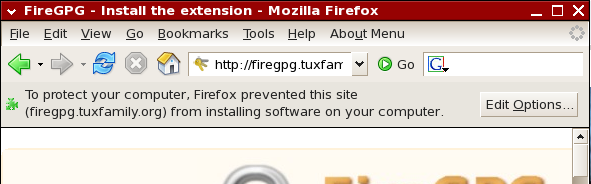
Example of an infobar in Mozilla Firefox.

An infobar is a graphical control element used by browsers including Firefox and Google Chrome and other software programs to display non-critical information to a user. It usually appears as a temporary extension of an existing toolbar, and may contain buttons or icons to allow the user to react to the event described in the infobar.

An infobar may be used as an alternative to dialog boxes as it does not interrupt the user's activities and allows the user to read extra information in their own time. Some infobars unobtrusively appear from the edge of the screen with a message displayed, possibly with response buttons to then hide or fade after several seconds.

Within Microsoft Outlook, an infobar may display information relevant to a specific type of email message, such as its sensitivity or message format.
