= List box =

Graphical control element

A generic list box

A list box is a graphical control element that allows the user to select one or more items from a list contained within a static, multiple line text box. The user clicks inside the box on an item to select it, sometimes in combination with the ⇧ Shift or Ctrl in order to make multiple selections. "Control-clicking" an item that has already been selected, unselects it.

A list box is called select or select1 in the XForms standard. Select is used for allowing the user to select many items from a list whereas select1 only allows the user to select a single item from a list.

== HTML ==
In web forms, the HTML elements <select multiple> and <option> are used to display a listbox:

<select multiple>
  <option>List item 1</option>
  <option>List item 2</option>
  <option>List item 3</option>
  <option>List item 4</option>
  <option>List item 5</option>
  <option>List item 6</option>
</select>

== See also ==
- Drop down list - Like a list box, but not permanently expanded to show the elements of the list.
- Combo box - Like a drop down list, but users also can make entries not on the list.
- Scrollbar
