= Drop-down list =

User interface element

A drop-down list or drop-down menu or drop menu, with generic entries

A drop-down list (DDL), drop-down menu or just drop-down – also known as a drop menu, pull-down list, picklist – is a graphical control element, similar to a list box, that allows the user to choose one value from a list either by clicking or hovering over the menu. When a drop-down list is inactive, it displays a single value. When activated, it displays (drops down) a list of values, from which the user may select one. When the user selects a new value, the control reverts to its inactive state, displaying the selected value. It is often used in the design of graphical user interfaces, including web design.

== Terminology ==
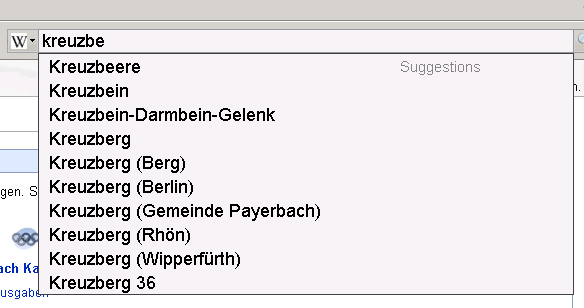
A drop-down list of search suggestions

This type of control is called a "pop-up menu" on the Macintosh platform; however, the term "pop-up menu" is used to refer to context menus in other GUI systems. The Macintosh also has the notion of "pull-down menus". The distinction is that, when the menu is closed, a pop-up menu's title shows the last-selected item while a pull-down menu shows a static title like a menu in the menu bar. Thus, the uses are different—pop-up menus are used to select a single option from a list while pull-down menus are used to issue commands or in cases where multiple options can be selected.

== HTML ==
In web forms, the HTML elements <select> and <option> are used to display a drop-down menu:

<select>
  <option>option1</option>
  <option>option2</option>
  <option>option3</option>
</select>

== GTK ==
GTK 4 has the Gtk.DropDown widget.

== See also ==
- Combo box
- List box
