= Incremental search =

User interface method to search for text

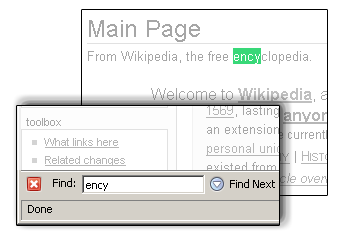
Screenshot of performing "Find as you type" in Mozilla Firefox. "ency" was being typed and the first matched text was highlighted in green.

In computing, incremental search, also known as hot search, incremental find or real-time suggestions, is a user interface interaction method to progressively search for and filter through text. As the user types text, one or more possible matches for the text are found and immediately presented to the user. This immediate feedback often allows the user to stop short of typing the entire word or phrase they were looking for. The user may also choose a closely related option from the presented list.

The method of incremental search is sometimes distinguished from user interfaces that employ a modal window, such as a dialog box, to enter searches. For some applications, a separate user interface mode may be used instead of a dialog box.

== History ==
The first documented use of incremental search was in EMACS on ITS in the late 1970s. This was one of the many essential Emacs features Richard Stallman included in his reimplementation, GNU Emacs. Other noteworthy programs containing this functionality in the 1980s include bash and Canon Cat. These early implementations offered single line feedback, not lists of suggestions.

The first mainstream appearance may have been in the Speller for WordPerfect 5.2 for Windows, released 30 November 1992. As programmer Robert John Stevens, now CEO of WriteExpress, watched users at the WordPerfect Usability Lab in Orem, Utah use the 5.1 Speller that he and Steven M. Cannon ported to Windows, he noticed that when a word was not found in the dictionary and no alternative words were presented, users seemed lost, moved the mouse cursor around the page and even exited the Speller. Dumbstruck by the anomaly, he went home, sat on the couch, and discussed his observations with his wife. Stevens coded the solution: as a user typed in the edit box, Speller would suggest words beginning with the letters entered. "You can type in the Replace With box any word you want to find. As you type letters into the box, possible matches are displayed."

== Variants ==
This feature, or variations thereof, has also been referred to as Autocomplete, search as you type, filter/find as you type (FAYT), incremental search, typeahead search, inline search, instant search, word wheeling, and other names as well.

Some common keyboard shortcuts for incremental find are Ctrl/Cmd-F (like for traditional find), F3, the GNU-style / (also applicable to Vim), or Emacs-style C-s.

=== Searches for files and media ===
This user interface method is also employed in varying contexts. For example, a user may encounter this feature while searching for files whose names match a string in an operating system's file explorer shell. The feature may also be used during searches for songs whose name or artist match a string in a media player.

=== Searches for user interface elements ===
Another variation is to filter through long lists of options or menu items that may appear within the user interface itself. Examples of this variation can be found in the about:config interface section of Mozilla Firefox version 2.0.0.14 and later versions; and in the bundle editor section of TextMate 1.5.7. This feature is also employed in application launchers such as Quicksilver 1.0.

Typically a list of matches is generated as the search query is typed, and the list is progressively narrowed to match the filter text.

=== Web search ===
In September 2010, Google introduced Google Instant, an incremental search feature for Google Search.

=== Resource consumption ===
Incremental search on a non-local server, as in Web search, uses more network bandwidth and server processing than non-incremental search, due to the handling of XMLHttpRequests (or similar) which are typically fired from each onkeyup event.

== Reception ==
Interface expert Jef Raskin has been a strong advocate of incremental search. In his 2000 book The Humane Interface, he wrote, "From the point of view of interface engineering, the advantages of incremental searching are so numerous and the advantages of delimited searches so few that I can see almost no occasions when a delimited search would be preferred." This was followed by a footnote reading, "A search is either incremental or excremental."

Incremental search has been criticised for exhibiting low affordance, as the text fields which provide it offer no visual indication of that fact until after the user begins typing.

== Specific applications ==
Non-modal incremental find is found in:

Modern web browsers:

- Firefox (since version 0.4)
- Opera
- Opera Mini
- Safari
- Chrome
- Internet Explorer 8
- Konqueror
- Midori

Instant messaging clients:

- Adium
- Windows Live Messenger

Modern operating systems:

- Apple's Mac OS X

Spotlight (which searches the entire computer)
Help menu (10.5 and newer)
System Preferences

- Microsoft's Windows Vista and 7

Start menu
Control Panel

- Linux's KDE 4 desktop environment uses this systematically

KWrite
Rekonq

- BlackBerry OS (version 6.0.0 and newer)

Editors and development environments:

- Eclipse
- Emacs
- IntelliJ IDEA
- NetBeans IDE
- Sublime Text
- Vim
- Visual Studio

Other applications:

- Apple's iTunes
- Google Toolbar 5
- less
- Windows Media Player
- Quicksilver
- Blender's search menu (version 2.5 and newer)
- Clara.io's explorer search menu

== See also ==
- Autofill
- Autocomplete
- Context-sensitive user interface
- Combo box
- Search suggest drop-down list
- Snippet (programming)
