= Delimited search =

Computing in which the user has to type in full for search interface

In computing, delimited search refers to a search user interface in which the user must type their query in full before initiating a search and receiving results. This is in contrast to incremental search, in which results are displayed to the user as they type their query.

== Critique ==
Interface design expert Jef Raskin critiqued delimited search (compared to incremental search) in his book The Humane Interface:

With a delimited search, the computer waits for the user to type a pattern and delimit it, after which it is the user who waits while the computer does the search. When using a delimited search the user must guess, beforehand, how much of a pattern the computer needs to distinguish the desired target from other, similar targets. With an incremental search, he can tell when he has typed enough to disambiguate the desired instance, because the target appeared on the display. (..) In spite of near agreement about the desirability of incremental searches on the part of both designers and users, almost all interface-building tools make it easy to implement delimited searches and difficult or impossible to implement incremental searches.
