= Aza Raskin =

American computer programmer

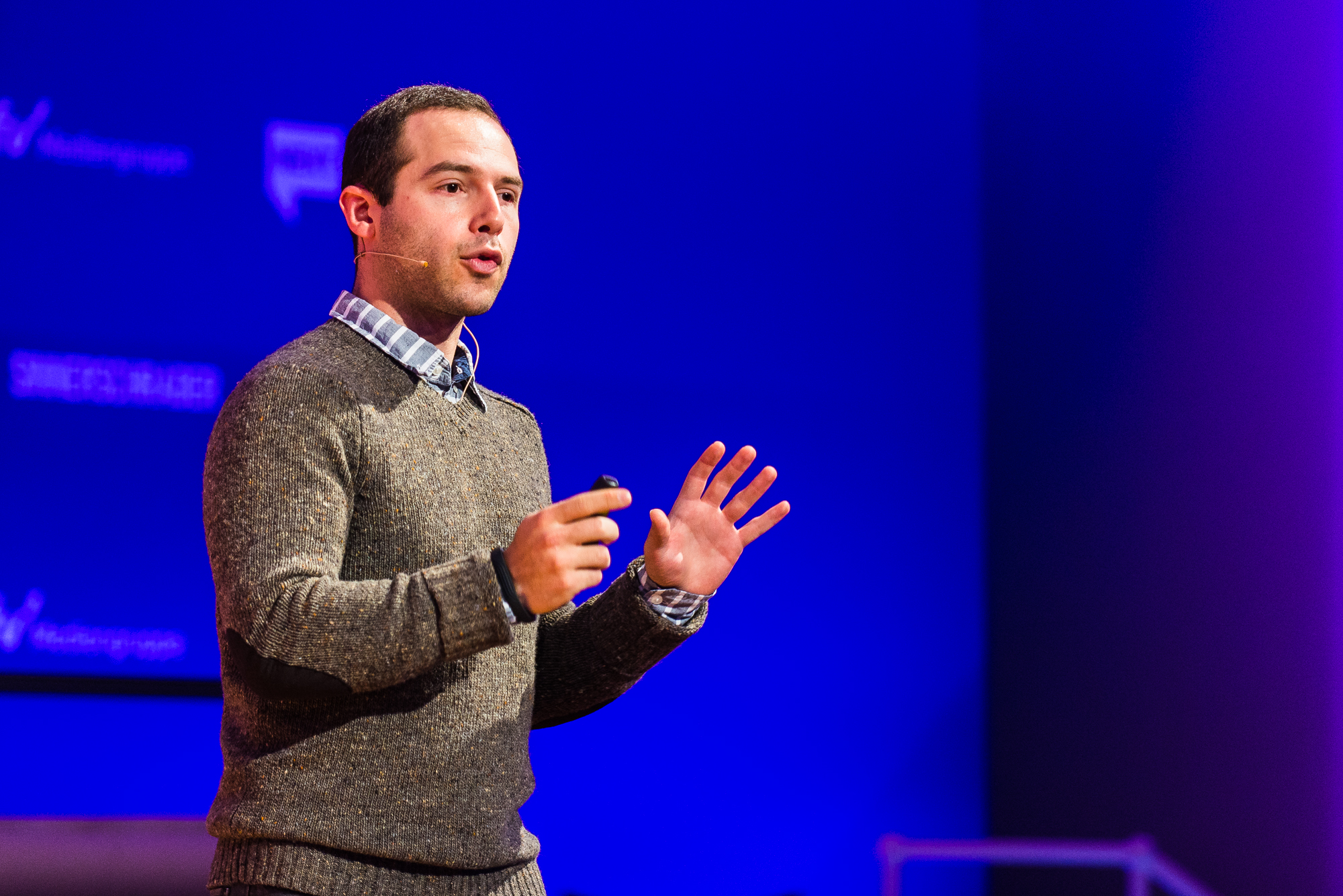
- Raskin in 2014
- Born: February 1, 1984 (age 42); California, United States
- Education: University of Chicago (BS)
- Occupations: interface designer, entrepreneur, writer
- Organization: Center for Humane Technology
- Parents: Jef Raskin; Linda S. Blum

Aza Raskin (born February 1, 1984) is the co-founder of the Center for Humane Technology and of the Earth Species Project. He is also a writer, entrepreneur, inventor, and interface designer. He is the son of Jef Raskin, a human–computer interface expert known for the Macintosh project at Apple.

Raskin is an advocate for the ethical use of technology, and has been critical of the effects that modern technology has on everyday lives and society. In the podcast Your Undivided Attention, along with Tristan Harris, Raskin has talked extensively about the power of information technology and the dangers it potentially poses to modern society.

Raskin coined the phrase, "freedom of speech is not freedom of reach," which was the title of an article that he wrote with Renée DiResta. The phrase is now widely used to refer to the large-scale implications of platform amplification and free speech. For example, it was publicly quoted by the comedian Sacha Baron Cohen, and was used by former Twitter CEO Jack Dorsey to help explain the rationale for banning political advertisements on Twitter.

Raskin has continued his father's work on project Archy, has worked as the head of user experience at Mozilla Labs and as lead designer for Firefox, and has founded a number of companies. More recently, he has collaborated on virtual reality projects and on zooming user interface (ZUI).

== Career ==
=== Personal projects ===
Aza Raskin participated in a talk with his father, Jef Raskin, on user interfaces, at age 10, at a meeting of the San Francisco chapter of the Special Interest Group on Computer-Human Interaction (SIGCHI). He holds bachelor's degrees in mathematics and physics from the University of Chicago.

In 2004, he worked with his father at the Raskin Center for Humane Interfaces, on the development of Archy software, which is a user interface paradigm. In 2005, after his father's death, he founded Humanized, where he continued working on the Archy paradigm and created the language-based, service-oriented Enso software.

Raskin is an active phishing researcher, best known for discovering the tabnabbing attack, which takes advantage of open browser tabs to launch phishing sites without the user's knowledge.

He also has a number of smaller projects, such as Algorithm Ink (based on Context Free), which generates art from a formal grammar.

In Wired UK magazine's series, Rebooting Britain, Raskin advocated for iterative governance, and was featured on the magazine's cover. He has also given a TED talk about new humane directions for computing.

=== Mozilla ===
In 2008, Humanized employees, including Raskin, joined the Mozilla Corporation as part of a hire-out. Raskin was named head of user experience at Mozilla Labs. In 2010, Raskin was appointed to the position of creative lead for Firefox. He has worked on several labs projects, including Ubiquity and Firefox for mobile, and he wrote the original specification for the geolocation application programming interface (API).

In 2010, Raskin introduced Tab Candy—the result of his work on the Firefox team at Mozilla. By organizing tabs spatially, Tab Candy allowed the user to "organize browsing, to see all of our tabs at once, and focus on the task at hand".

Computerworld called Tab Candy's initial design and alpha release "the best new browser feature since tabs were invented". Tab Candy—renamed Firefox Panorama—was incorporated into the initial Firefox 4 release (as a hidden default), but it was later removed from the default Firefox package and converted to an add-on.

=== Startups ===
Raskin has founded two other companies besides Humanized, including Songza, a music meta-search tool, and Bloxes, which sold furniture made out of cardboard. Songza was acquired in late 2008 by Amie Street, an Amazon-backed company. Songza was eventually bought by Google and now powers much of Google Play. Songza was also responsible for enabling the creation of mood- and activity-based playlists.

By the end of 2010, Raskin had left Mozilla to co-launch a start-up company called Massive Health. His goal was to apply design principles to the goal of maintaining health. In 2011, Fast Company conferred its Master of Design award on him for this work. On April 16, 2012, Massive Health announced that Raskin would lead the company as its “chief vision officer”. In 2013, Massive Health was acquired by Jawbone.

In 2017, Raskin founded the Earth Species Project, a non-profit organization focused on using AI to decode non-human communication, especially human–animal communication. The project is the subject of an NPR Invisibilia podcast episode in 2020.

=== Media and other activities ===
In 2018, Raskin was featured on the cover of Off Screen Magazine. In 2019 he was selected to be a guest curator for Ars Electronica's 40th anniversary exhibit. and has exhibited his artwork at an exhibition about North and South Korea.

Raskin has been featured in Forbes 30 Under 30, and included in Fast Company's “Most Creative People" list.

=== Opinions on technology use ===
As one of the co-founders of the Center for Humane Technology, Raskin has been an advocate for the ethical use of technology, and is critical of the far-reaching and often negative effects that modern technology has on everyday lives and society. He has given talks on this topic for Wired magazine, The Wall Street Journal, Bits & Pretzels, Slush, Humanity 2.0, and Laurie Segall.

=== Works ===
==== Writing ====
- Raskin, Aza (July 13, 2007). "Never Use A Warning When You Mean Undo". A List Apart. Archived from the original on March 2, 2009.
- Raskin, Aza (October 24, 2006). Death of the Desktop. The Ajax Experience. Archived from the original on March 3, 2009.
- Raskin, Aza (June 30, 2006). "Collaboration Made Simple with Bracket Notation". Humanized. Archived from the original on January 30, 2009.
- Raskin, Aza (January–February 2008). "The Linguistic Command Line". Interactions. 15 (1). Association for Computing Machinery: 19–22. doi:10.1145/1330526.1330535. S2CID 7819664.
- Jakobsson, Markus; Myers, Steven, eds. (2006). Phishing and Counter-Measures: Understanding the Increasing Problem of Electronic Identity Theft. Wiley. p. 800. ISBN 0-471-78245-9. (contributor)
- Raskin, Aza (May 7, 2020). "Growth Teams Have the Tools to Be Coronavirus Anti-Growth Teams". Wired.

==== Talks ====
- Raskin, Aza (May 4, 2007). Away with Applications: The Death of the Desktop. Google Tech Talk. YouTube. Archived from the original on December 15, 2021.
- Raskin, Aza (April 2, 2008). Don't Make Me Click. Google Tech Talk. YouTube. Archived from the original on December 15, 2021.
- Raskin, Aza (December 7, 2018). How to Create Human Protective Technology by Aza Raskin. Slush.
- Raskin, Aza (June 28, 2019). Rebalancing Our Relationship With Tech. Wired magazine.
- Raskin, Aza (July 2, 2018). Silicon Valley Renegades Take On Tech Obsession. The Wall Street Journal.
- Raskin, Aza (July 2, 2019). Aza Raskin from the Center for Humane Technology on the impact of technology on the human condition. Humanity 2.0.
- Raskin, Aza (November 28, 2019). Aza Raskin (Center for Humane Technology): The digital attention crisis. Bits & Pretzels.
- Raskin, Aza (December 9, 2019). Tech's Next Threat: The Weaponization of Loneliness. First Contact with Laurie Segall. iHeart Radio.
