= Ubiquity =

Ubiquity may refer to:

- Ubiquity (software), a simple graphical installer made for the Ubuntu operating system
- Ubiquity (Firefox), an experimental extension for the Firefox browser
- Ubiquity (role-playing game system), a table-top RPG system
- Ubiquiti, an American wireless data communication company
- Ubiquity Records, an American music label
- Ubiquity, a publication by the Association for Computing Machinery
- Ubiquity Press, an academic publisher

== See also ==
- Omnipresence
