= Birch index =

Economic indicator of employment

The Birch (Employee Growth) Index is an economic indicator of employment. It multiplies absolute job growth by relative job growth, which reveals the employment-creation power of differently sized enterprises.

It was devised by economist David L. Birch at the Massachusetts Institute of Technology. In 1980 Birch published an influential study that showed 70% of job growth in the U.S. came from enterprises with fewer than 100 employees.
