= Automation surprise =

Unexpected action by an automated system

An automation surprise is an action that is performed by an automation system and is unexpected by the user. A mode error can be a common cause of an automation surprise. Automation surprise can be dangerous when it upsets the situational awareness of a control operator.

== See also ==
- Human factors
- Air safety
