= Leo Irakliotis =

Leo Irakliotis is a computer engineer. His early work was on optical information processing. With Leo Kadanoff he founded the Center for Presentation of Science at the University of Chicago, where he taught computer science from 1997 until 2009. Irakliotis earned a master's degree in theoretical physics from Miami University (Ohio) and a Ph.D. degree in Electrical and Computer Engineering from Colorado State University. In 2005, Irakliotis worked with Jef Raskin to design a new curriculum on humane interfaces and computer enterprises. The project was never completed due to Raskin's death in the same year.
