= Confirmation dialog =

Dialog box in an computer interface

Confirmation dialog (sometimes called a warning alert box) is a dialog box that asks user to approve requested operation. Usually this dialog appears before a potentially dangerous operation is performed (program termination, file deletion, etc.)

Typically confirmation dialog boxes have two buttons (e.g. Yes / No, Confirm / Cancel) or three buttons (e. g. Save / Discard / Cancel).

Some human interface guidelines recommend avoiding unnecessary confirmation dialogs. BlackBerry and Sun Java UI guidelines recommended a confirmation button be put before a cancellation button; but a default button should not be associated with a major destructive action.

== See also ==
- Error-tolerant design
- Alert dialog box
