= Meta refresh =

Method of instructing a browser to automatically refresh a web page

Meta refresh is a method of instructing a web browser to automatically refresh the current web page or frame after a given time interval, using an HTML meta element with the http-equiv parameter set to "refresh" and a content parameter giving the time interval in seconds. It is also possible to instruct the browser to fetch a different URL when the page is refreshed, by including the alternative URL in the content parameter. By setting the refresh time interval to zero (or a very low value), meta refresh can be used as a method of URL redirection.

== History ==
This feature was originally introduced by Netscape Navigator 1.1 (circa 1995), in a form of HTTP header and corresponding HTML meta HTTP-equivalent element, which allows document author to signal client to automatically reload the document or change to a specified URL after a specified timeout. It is the earliest polling mechanism available for the web, allowing a user to see the latest update in a frequently-changing webpage, such as ones displaying football live scores or weather forecast.

== Usability ==
Use of meta refresh is discouraged by the World Wide Web Consortium (W3C), since unexpected refresh can disorient users. Meta refresh also impairs the web browser's "back" button in some browsers (including Internet Explorer 6 and before), although most modern browsers compensate for this (Internet Explorer 7 and higher, Mozilla Firefox, Opera, Google Chrome).

There are legitimate uses of meta-refresh, such as providing updates to dynamic web pages or implementing site controlled navigation of a website without JavaScript. Many large websites use it to refresh news or status updates, especially when dependencies on JavaScript and redirect headers are unwanted.

== Examples ==
Place inside the <head> element to refresh page after 5 seconds:

<meta http-equiv="refresh" content="5">

Redirect to https://example.com/ after 5 seconds:

<meta http-equiv="refresh" content="5; url=https://example.com/">

Redirect to https://example.com/ immediately:

<meta http-equiv="refresh" content="0; url=https://example.com/">

== Security and Usability issues ==
- With Meta refresh it is possible to use a Phishing technique called Tabnabbing.
- A reader may or may not want to be redirected to a different page, which can lead to user dissatisfaction or raise concerns about security.
- If a page redirects too quickly (less than 2–3 seconds), using the "Back" button on the next page may cause some browsers to move back to the redirecting page, whereupon the redirect will occur again. This is bad for usability, as this may cause a reader to be "stuck" on the last website.

== Alternatives ==
Meta refresh uses the http-equiv meta tag to emulate the Refresh HTTP header, and as such can also be sent as a header by an HTTP web server. Although Refresh is not part of the HTTP standard, it is supported by all common browsers.

HTTP Header example of a redirect to https://example.com/ after 5 seconds:

Refresh: 5; url=https://www.example.com/

Alternatives exist for both uses of meta refresh.

=== For redirection ===
An alternative is to send an HTTP redirection status code, such as HTTP 301 or 302. It is the preferred way to redirect a user agent to a different page. This can be achieved by a special rule in the Web server or by means of a simple script on the Web server.

JavaScript is another alternative, but not recommended, because users might have disabled JavaScript in their browsers.

The simplest way of JavaScript redirect using the onload property of the body tag:

<body onload="window.location = 'http://example.com/'">

<!-- Your content here -->

</body>

=== For refresh ===
An alternative method is to provide an interaction device, such as a button, to let the user choose when to refresh the content. Another option is using a technique such as Ajax to update (parts of) the Web site without the need for a complete page refresh, but this would also require that the user enable JavaScript in their browser.

You can refresh a web page using JavaScript location.reload method. This code can be called automatically upon an event or simply when the user clicks on a link. If you want to refresh a web page using a mouse click, then you can use the following code :

<a href="javascript:location.reload(true)">Refresh this Page</a>
