= Songza =

Free music streaming and recommendation service

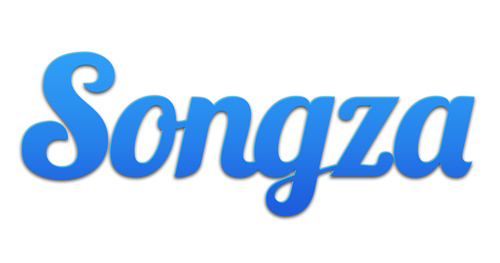
- Website type: Free internet radio
- Available in: English
- Headquarters: Long Island City, Queens, New York City, New York, United States
- Owner: Alphabet Inc.
- Creators: Aza Raskin and Scott Robbin
- Website: Songza
- Launched: November 8, 2007 (19 years ago)
- Current status: Discontinued (Merged into Google Play Music and subsequently into YouTube Music)

Songza was a free music streaming and recommendation service for Internet users in the United States and Canada.

Stating that its playlists are made by music experts, the service would recommend its users on various playlists based on time of day and mood or activity. Songza offered playlists for activities such as waking up, working out, commuting, concentrating, unwinding, entertaining, and sleeping. Users would vote songs up or down, and the service will adapt to the user's personal music preferences. Users would find playlists not just based on artists, songs, or genres, but also based on themes, interests, and eras, such as "90s One-Hit Wonders", or "Music of Fashion Week".

Songza was headquartered in the Long Island City neighborhood of the Queens borough of New York City, New York.

Songza was purchased by Google on July 1, 2014, and on December 2, 2015, Google announced Songza would merge into Google Play Music on January 31, 2016. As of September 24, 2021, the main site is offline, displaying a redirect to YouTube Music.

== History ==
Amie Street acquired Songza, a product created by Aza Raskin and Scott Robbin, in October 2008. In August 2010, Amie Street was sold to Amazon for an undisclosed amount. Shortly after this the co-founders – CEO Elias Roman, COO Peter Asbill, CPO Elliott Breece and CCO Eric Davich – refocused their efforts on Songza. The team discontinued the original version and relaunched a new alpha version of Songza, keeping nothing of the original product but the name.

Over the next year the founders experimented with various iterations. When the app originally launched in 2010, it was described by PandoDaily as "like a pre-Turntable.fm. A function called Social Radio allowed users to be DJs for their friends." This version of the app allowed it to be social and crowdsourced; the problem with it was that the service as it stood was not sufficiently differentiated from other services on the market and the quality of the crowd sourced playlists was low. Following a year of testing various iterations of the alpha version of the app, Songza relaunched in beta on iPhone and Android apps on September 13, 2011, armed with a team of 25 expert music curators.

In March 2012, Songza released its Music Concierge feature, on iPhone and the web. The concierge presented users with up to six situations based on time of day, with filters for whatever mood they might be in. For example, on a Wednesday morning a user may have been presented with situations for "Waking Up", "Singing in the Shower", "Working Out" and so on. This feature was rolled out to iPad on June 7, 2012; during the first ten days following the iPad app launch, Songza saw over 1.15 million downloads.

On June 12, 2012, Songza was listed as the top free app on iTunes for the iPad and the number two free app for the iPhone. Concierge was released on Android on July 10, 2012, and for Android tablets on August 14, 2012. The app expanded to Canada on August 7, 2012, and became the number-one overall free app in Canada on August 13, 2012. Within the week of Microsoft's Build developer event in June 2013, Songza snuck in its official Windows 8 app.

Songza launched in Canada on August 7, 2012, and reached the one million download mark after 70 days.

Starting October 2013, Songza began inserting pop-up audio/video ads when initiating a playlist, making it no longer "audio-ad free". Songza reported having 5.5 million regular users at the end of 2013.

Songza was acquired by Google on July 1, 2014. No terms were disclosed but speculation put the price at somewhere between $15 million and $39 million. Both companies issued statements saying they were "thrilled" to be doing the deal. In October 2014, following the acquisition, the Google Play Music All Access service was updated to include functionality adapted from Songza's Concierge system.

Songza was merged into Google Play Music on January 31, 2016, which itself was shut down on December 1, 2020. As of September 24, 2021, the Songza website is offline, and its former URL displays a redirect to YouTube Music, Google's (likewise defunct) music streaming service.
