= Transient screen =

Type of pop-up on mobile devices

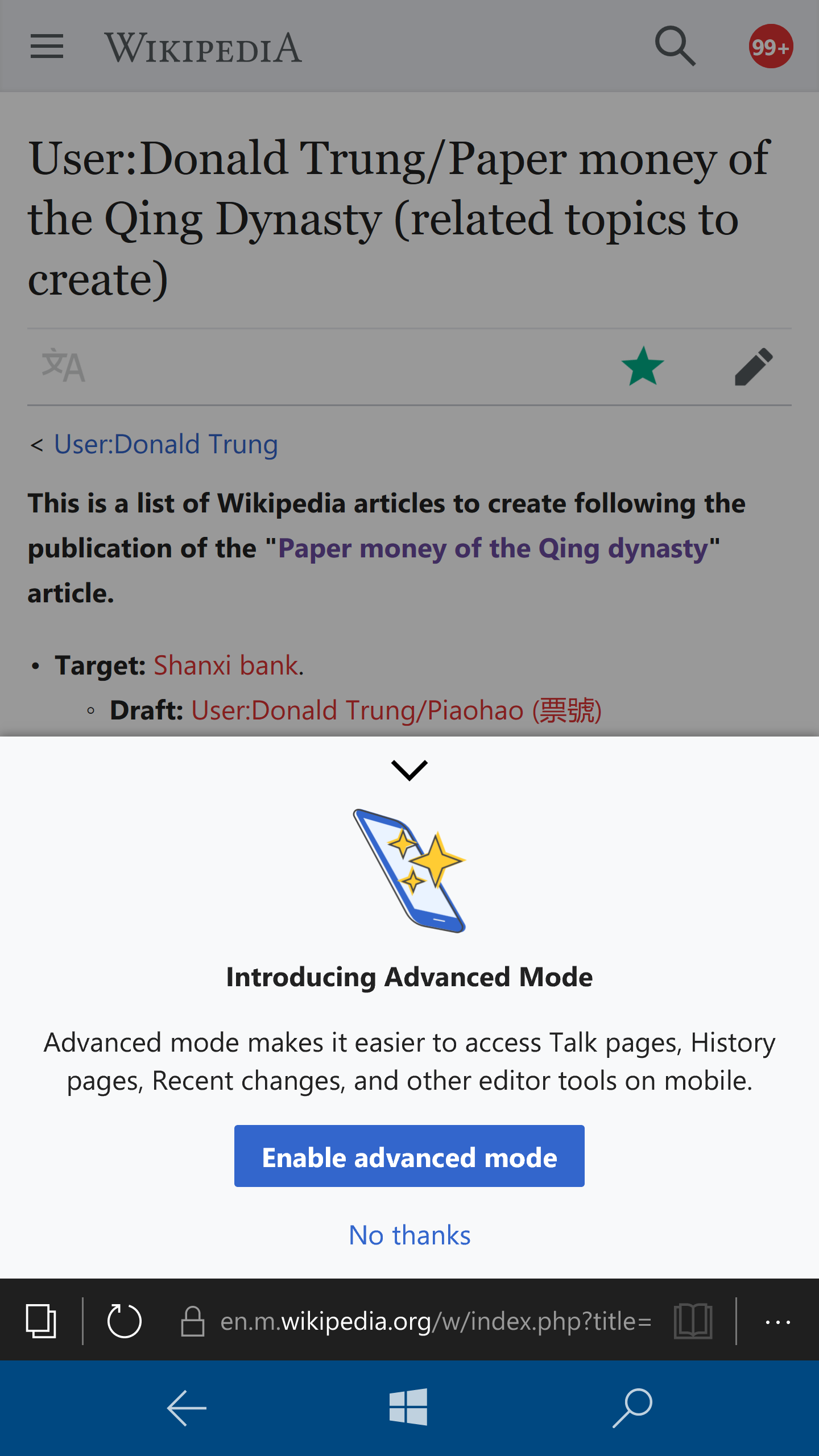
A transient screen on mobile Wikipedia notifying the user about the new user interface for mobile editors.

A transient screen is a pop-up screen such as a notification or dialog screen on a mobile phone.

It covers only part of the screen as well as dimming the remaining area. It helps to give the user a potentially high priority message, such as a new text message, voice mail or incoming phone call, either when the user gives the phone their attention, for example, by opening a flip phone or when running an application such as a game in the foreground.
