= Ubiquity (Firefox) =

Discontinued extension for Mozilla Firefox

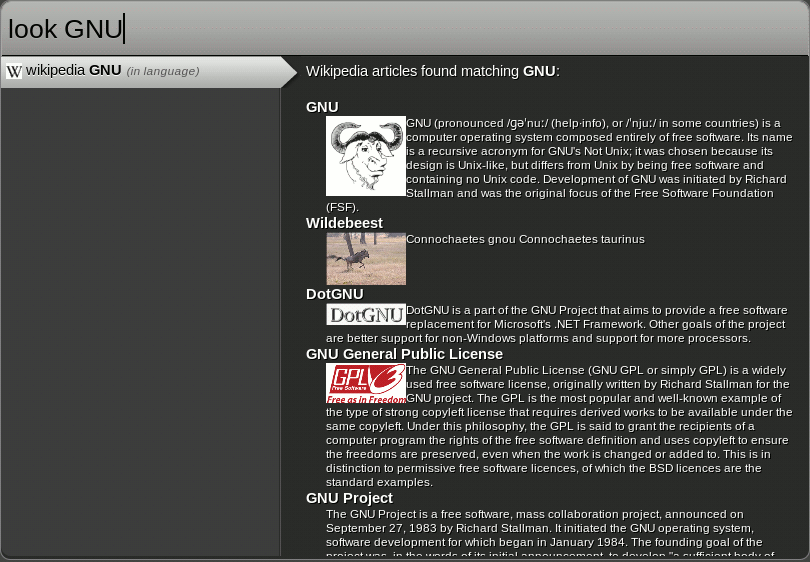
- The Ubiquity extension in action
- Original author: Mozilla Labs
- Developer: Mozilla
- Initial release: August 26, 2008
- Stable release: 0.6 / October 16, 2012; 13 years ago
- Preview release: 0.6.2pre / September 3, 2011; 14 years ago
- Written in: JavaScript
- Size: 595 KB
- Type: Add-on for Mozilla Firefox
- License: MPL/GNU GPL/GNU LGPL
- Website: Ubiquity on wiki.mozilla.org.

Ubiquity, a legacy extension for Mozilla Firefox, was a collection of quick and easy natural-language-derived commands that act as mashups of web services, thus allowing users to get information and relate it to current and other webpages. It also allowed Web users to create new commands without requiring much technical background.

== Overview ==
Ubiquity's main goal was to take a disjointed web and bring a user everything they need. This was accomplished through a command-line-like interface that was based on natural language commands. These commands were supplied both by Mozilla and by individual users. Commands were written in JavaScript or Python and either directly typed into the command editor that comes with Ubiquity or subscribed to. Commands to which a user subscribed were automatically updated when the author updated the code. Up to the end of development, there was no limit as to what these commands can do, posing a large security risk. There were plans for Ubiquity to have a trust network that would allow users to evaluate the trustworthiness of a particular command before subscribing to it, but these plans never came to fruition.

Ubiquity had commands that allowed users to insert maps anywhere, translate on-page, highlight any code, and many other features.

== Development history and roadmap ==
The architectural design for Ubiquity 0.1.3 was focused on separating functions into well-defined objects, an idea borrowed from the design of commands in the Archy project. The browser window functionality was separated into per-window and global objects. The per-window command manager object mediated between the context menu, command entry and natural-language parser objects and the commands themselves. The global objects marshall application-wide services such as built-in command feeds. Efforts to localize Ubiquity into different languages have also been made.

The design goals for Ubiquity 0.5 focused on making it easier to experiment with new user interfaces and implement security measures.

After Mozilla ceased development of Ubiquity, a community-maintained version was actively developed until 2016.

== See also ==
- Greasemonkey
- iMacros
- EMML
- Mozilla Jetpack
