= Zooming user interface =

Graphical interface allowing image scaling

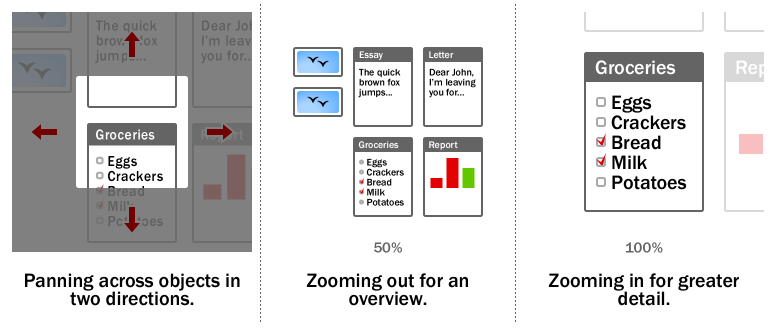
Example of a ZUI

In computing, a zooming user interface or zoomable user interface (ZUI, pronounced zoo-ee) is a type of graphical user interface (GUI) on which users can change the scale of the viewed area in order to see more detail or less, and browse through different documents. Information elements appear directly on an infinite virtual desktop (usually created using vector graphics), instead of in windows. Users can pan across the virtual surface in two dimensions and zoom into objects of interest. For example, as the user zooms into a text object, it may be represented as a small dot, then a page thumbnail, then a full-size page, and finally a magnified view of the page.

ZUIs use zooming as the main metaphor for browsing through hyperlinked or multivariate information. Objects present inside a zoomed page can, in turn, be zoomed themselves to reveal further detail, allowing for recursive nesting and an arbitrary level of zoom.

Researchers have described the ZUI paradigm as a Post-WIMP interface and potential successor to the traditional windowing GUI.

The term ZUI was coined by Franklin Servan-Schreiber while working at Sony Research Laboratories, in partnership with Ben Bederson and Ken Perlin of New York University.

== History ==
In 1962, Ivan Sutherland presented the first program for zooming through and creating graphical structures with constraints and instancing, on a CRT in his Sketchpad program.

A more general interface was developed by the Architecture Machine Group at MIT in the 1970s. Hand tracking, touchscreen, joystick, and voice control were employed to control an infinite plane of projects, documents, contacts, video, and interactive programs. One of the instances of this project was called Spatial Dataland.

Another GUI environment of the '70s, which used the zooming idea was Smalltalk at Xerox PARC, which had infinite desktops (only later named such by Apple Computer), that could be zoomed in upon from a birds-eye view after the user had recognized a miniature of the window setup for the project.

The longest running effort to create a ZUI has been the Pad++ project begun by Ken Perlin, Jim Hollan, and Ben Bederson at New York University and continued at the University of New Mexico under Hollan's direction. After Pad++, Bederson developed Jazz, then Piccolo, and now Piccolo2D at the University of Maryland, College Park, which is maintained in Java and C#.

More recent ZUI efforts include Archy by the late Jef Raskin, ZVTM developed at INRIA (which uses the Sigma lens technique), and the simple ZUI of the Squeak Smalltalk programming environment and language.

GeoPhoenix, a startup associated with the MIT Media Lab, founded by Julian Orbanes, Adriana Guzman, and Max Riesenhuber, released a mass-marketed commercial Zoomspace in 2002–03 on the Sony CLIÉ personal digital assistant (PDA) handheld, with Ken Miura of Sony.

In 2002, Pieter Muller extended the Oberon System with a zooming user interface and named it Active Object System (AOS). In 2005, due to copyright issues, it was renamed to Bluebottle, and in 2008, to A2.

In 2005, Franklin Servan-Schreiber founded Zoomorama, based on work he did at the Sony Research Laboratories in the mid-1990s. The Zooming Browser for Collage of High Resolution Images was released in Alpha in October 2007. Zoomorama's browser is all Flash-based. In 2010, project development ended, but many examples remain on the site.

In 2006, Hillcrest Labs introduced the HoME television navigation system, the first graphical, zooming interface for television.

In 2007, Microsoft's Live Labs released a zooming UI for web browsing called Microsoft Live Labs Deepfish for the Windows Mobile 5 platform.

Apple's iPhone (premiered June 2007) uses a stylized form of ZUI, in which panning and zooming are performed through a touch user interface (TUI). A more fully realized ZUI is present in the iOS home screen (as of iOS 7), with zooming from the home screen into folders and, finally, into apps. The photo app zooms out from a single photo to moments, collections, and years, and similarly, the calendar app zooms out from day, month, and year views. It is not a full ZUI implementation since these operations are applied to bounded spaces (such as web pages or photos) and have a limited range of zooming and panning.

From 2008 to 2010, GNOME Shell used a zooming user interface for virtual workspaces management. This ZUI was eventually replaced by a different, scrolling-based design.

Prezi, a web-based presentation tool built on a single zoomable canvas, launched in 2009. Rather than build slides, users place content on an open surface and define a sequence of frames that the software navigates by panning, zooming, and rotating during playback. It was the first ZUI to reach mainstream adoption, surpassing 50 million users by 2014.

Stack Zooming, launched in 2010, was designed to navigate one-dimensional datasets such as time series by combining zooming and layering to keep the full dataset visible. In 2012, PolyZoom extended the Stack Zooming concept to two-dimensional spaces.

In 2017, bigpictu.re offered an infinite (pan and zoom) notepad as a web application based on one of the first ZUI open-source libraries.

In 2017, Zircle UI was released. It is an open-source UI library that uses zoomable navigation and circular shapes.

== Types of zooming ==
Zooming interfaces have implemented several types of zooming behaviors, including:

- Geometric zooming scales objects in direct proportion to the zoom level, and is the most common zoom method in zoomable user interfaces.
- Semantic zooming changes the representation of an object based on scale, rather than simply resizing it. In Pad's multiscale calendar, zooming out shows a grid of years while zooming in reveals individual days; in Pad++, a digital clock shows hours and minutes at normal size, seconds when zoomed in, and just the hour when zoomed out.
- Fisheye zooming preserves the area of focus in full detail while compressing surrounding elements more with distance. Furnas demonstrated the technique using a botanical taxonomy, in which nodes far from the current focus were removed entirely from the display when their degree of interest fell below a threshold.
  - Logical fisheye zooming shows the focus in full detail and filters everything else by a degree-of-interest score based on structural distance rather than screen position. Implemented in Furnas's C program viewer, which shows the current line in full detail while removing distant code below the degree-of-interest threshold.
  - Graphical fisheye zooming distorts coordinate space so nearby elements enlarge and distant ones compress, with each element's pre-assigned importance also shaping how much space and detail it receives. Implemented in Sarkar & Brown's interactive graph browser.
  - Intelligent zooming combines fisheye zooming with adaptive presentation; the system determines the most appropriate display format for each element. Implemented in Bartram et al.'s network supervisory control interface for telecommunications.
  - Semantic fisheye zooming extends fisheye views by using semantic distance metrics, preserving the area of focus in full detail and de-emphasizing other elements based on how closely each element relates to the current task, rather than by physical distance on-screen. Implemented in a tabular flight itinerary browser, and an experimental VUE-based concept map interface.
- Topological zooming uses graph structure to calibrate detail. The focus node renders at full resolution; everything farther out is replaced with coarser, precomputed approximations of the graph. Implemented in Gansner et al.'s topological zooming tool for visualizing large graphs.

== See also ==
- Vector-based graphical user interface
- Resolution independence
