= David L. Birch =

American economist

David L. Birch (born 1937) is an American economist studying small businesses.

Birch was working as a director at MIT in 1979 when he published his report The Job Generation Process, in which he showed that, contrary to the prevailing conventional wisdom, most new jobs in the US are created by small and new companies. This study caught the attention of politicians at home and abroad. Birch followed in 1987 with the book Job creation in America : how our smallest companies put the most people to work. Birch's work has been heavily criticized but is nevertheless considered groundbreaking as it opened the field for the study of small businesses, which had been so far disregarded by economists.
