= Jef Raskin =

American computer scientist (1943–2005)

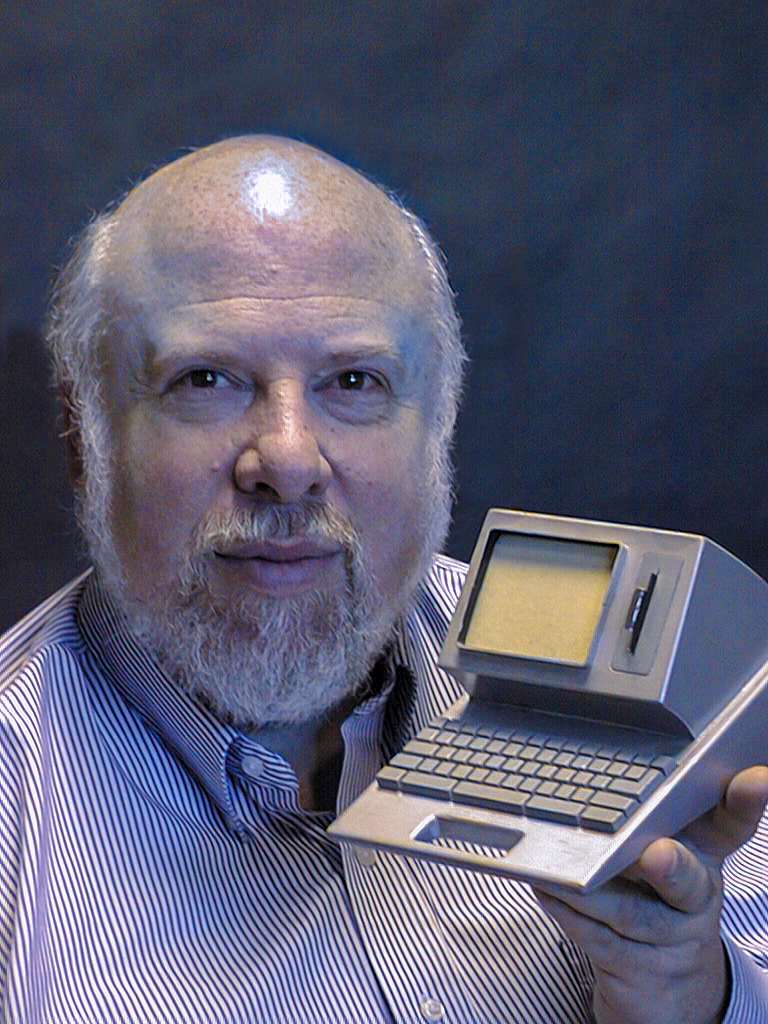
- Raskin holds a model of the Canon Cat in January 1999.
- Born: March 9, 1943; New York City, U.S.
- Died: February 26, 2005 (aged 61); Pacifica, California, U.S.
- Known for: Human–computer interface expert
- Spouse: Linda S. Blum (m. 1982)
- Children: 3, including Aza Raskin

Jef Raskin (born Jeff Raskin; March 9, 1943 – February 26, 2005) was an American human–computer interface expert who conceived and began leading the Macintosh project at Apple in the late 1970s.

== Early life and education ==
Jef Raskin was born in New York City to a secular Jewish family, whose surname is a matronymic from "Raske", Yiddish nickname for Rachel. He received a BA in mathematics and a BS in physics with minors in philosophy and music from Stony Brook University. In 1967, he received a master's degree in computer science from Pennsylvania State University, after having switched from mathematical logic due to differences of opinion with his advisor. Even though he had completed work typical for a PhD, the university was not accredited for a PhD in computer science. The first original computer application he wrote was a music application as part of his master's thesis.

Raskin later enrolled in a graduate music program at the University of California, San Diego (UCSD), but quit to teach art, photography, and computer science there. He worked as an assistant professor in the Visual Arts department from 1968 until 1974. There, he presented shows about toys as works of art. Raskin announced his resignation from the assistant professorship by flying over the Chancellor's house in a hot air balloon. He was awarded a National Science Foundation grant to establish a Computer and Humanities center, which used several 16-bit Data General Nova computers and CRTs, rather than the more common Teletype teleprinters.

Along with his undergraduate student Jonathan (Jon) Collins, Raskin developed the FLOW programming language for use in teaching programming to the art and humanities students. The language was first used at the Humanities Summer Training Institute held in 1970 at the University of Kansas in Lawrence, Kansas. The language has only seven statements (COMMENT, GET IT, PRINT IT, PRINT "text", JUMP TO, IF IT IS " " JUMP TO, and STOP) and can not manipulate numbers. The language was first implemented in Fortran by Collins in under a week. Later versions of the language utilized "typing amplification" in which only the first letter is typed and the computer provides the balance of the instruction eliminating typing errors. It was also the basis for programming classes taught by Raskin and Collins in the UCSD Visual Arts Department.

Raskin curated several art shows including one featuring his collection of unusual toys, and presenting toys as works of art. During this period, he changed the spelling of his name from "Jeff" to "Jef" after having met Jon Collins and liking the lack of extraneous letters.

Raskin occasionally wrote for computer publications, such as Dr. Dobb's Journal. He formed a company named Bannister and Crun, which was named for two characters playing in the BBC radio comedy The Goon Show.

== Career history ==
=== Apple ===
==== Contractor writer ====
Raskin first met Apple Computer co-founders Steve Jobs and Steve Wozniak in their garage workshop following the debut of their Apple II personal computer at the first West Coast Computer Faire. Jobs hired Raskin's company Bannister and Crun to write the Apple II BASIC Programming Manual. Raskin said "I was talking fifty dollars a page. They talked fifty dollars for the whole manual." Writing on an Apple II unit with the serial number of "2", he created "a literate manual that became a standard for the young industry".

==== Management ====
In January 1978, Raskin joined Apple as Manager of Publications, the company's 31st employee. For some time he continued as Director of Publications and New Product Review, and also worked on packaging and other issues. He had concealed his degree in computer science, out of concern for cultural bias against academia among the hobby-driven personal computer industry. He explained, "If they had known ... they might not have let me in the company, because there was such an antiacademic bias in the early Apple days."

From his responsibility for documentation and testing, Raskin had great influence on early engineering projects. Because the Apple II only displayed uppercase characters on a 40-column screen, his department used the PolyMorphic Systems 8813 (an Intel-8080-based machine running a proprietary operating system called Exec) to write documentation; this spurred the development of an 80-column display card and a suitable text editor for the Apple II. His experiences testing Applesoft BASIC inspired him to design a competing product, called Notzo BASIC, which was never implemented. When Wozniak developed the first disk drives for the Apple II, Raskin went back to his contacts at UCSD and encouraged them to port the UCSD P-System operating system, which incorporated a version of the Pascal programming language. Apple later licensed and shipped it as Apple Pascal.

Through this time, Raskin continually wrote memos about how the personal computer could become a true consumer appliance. While the Apple III was under development in 1978 and '79, Raskin was lobbying for Apple to create a radically different kind of computer that was designed from the start to be easy to use. In Computers by the Millions, he stated that expandable computers like the Apple II were too complex, and development was difficult due to the unknown nature of the machine the program ran on. The machine he envisioned was very different from the Macintosh that was eventually released and had much more in common with PDAs than modern desktop-based machines.

==== Macintosh ====
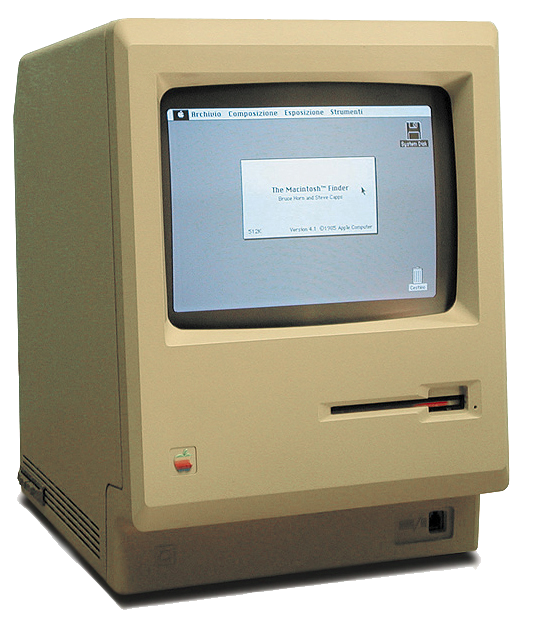
The launched Macintosh has slight resemblance to Raskin's design.

Raskin started the Macintosh project in 1979 to implement some of these ideas. He later hired his former student Bill Atkinson from UCSD to Apple, along with Andy Hertzfeld and Burrell Smith from the Apple Service Department, which was located in the same building as the Publications Department. Secretly bypassing Jobs's ego and authority by continually securing permission and funding directly at the executive level, Raskin created and solely supervised the Macintosh project for approximately its first year. This included selecting the name of his favorite apple, writing the mission document The Book of Macintosh, securing office space, and recruiting and managing the original staff. Author Steven Levy said, "It was Raskin who provided the powerful vision of a computer whose legacy would be low cost, high utility, and a groundbreaking friendliness."

Raskin's own recollections about the creation of the Macintosh and his work as a software designer are described in the book Programmers at Work, a collection of interviews published by Microsoft Press in 1986.

The Macintosh prototype was similar in power to the Apple II and included a small 9-inch (230 mm) black-and-white character display and floppy drive, in a small case. It was text only, as Raskin disliked the computer mouse or anything else that could take his hands from the keyboard. Several basic applications were built into the machine, selectable by pressing function keys. The machine included logic to understand user intentions and switch programs dynamically. For instance, if the user simply started typing text it switched into editor mode, and if numbers are typed it switched to calculator mode. In many cases these switches were largely invisible to the user.

It was clear that Macintosh was the most interesting thing at Apple—and Steve Jobs took it over.

— Jef Raskin

In 1981, after the Lisa team had "kicked him out", Steve Jobs's attention drew toward Raskin's Macintosh project, intending to combine the Xerox PARC-inspired GUI-based Lisa design to Raskin's appliance-computing, "computers-by-the-millions" concept. Steve Wozniak, who around then had been co-leading the Macintosh team with Raskin, was on hiatus from the company following a traumatic airplane accident, allowing Jobs to take managerial lead over the project.

Raskin is credited as one of the first to introduce Jobs and the Lisa engineers to the PARC concepts, though he ultimately dismissed PARC's technology and opposed the use of the mouse. Raskin claimed to have had continued direct input into the eventual Mac design, including the decision to use a one-button mouse as part of the Apple interface, instead of PARC's 3-button mouse. Others, including Larry Tesler, acknowledge his advocacy for a one-button mouse but say that it was a decision reached simultaneously by others at Apple who had stronger authority on the issue. Raskin later stated that were he to redesign the mouse, it would have three clearly labeled buttons—two buttons on top marked "Select" and "Activate", and a "Grab" button on the side that could be used by squeezing the mouse. It has the three described buttons (two invisible), but they are assigned to different functions than Raskin specified for his own interface and can be customized.

In 2005, Macintosh project member Andy Hertzfeld remembered Raskin's reputation for often inaccurately claiming to have invented various technologies. Raskin's resume from 2002 lends credence by stating he was "Creator of Macintosh computer at Apple Computer, Inc." Raskin conceived and solely supervised the Macintosh project for approximately its first year; however, Hertzfeld describes Raskin's relationship to the drastically different finished Mac product more like that of an "eccentric great uncle" than its father. In Jobs's "Lost Interview" from 1996, he refers to the Macintosh as a product of team effort while acknowledging Raskin's early role. Jobs reportedly co-opted some of Raskin's leadership philosophies, such as when he wrote the slogan on the Macintosh group's easel, "It's better to be a pirate than to join the Navy."

Apple acknowledged Raskin's role after he had left the company by gifting him the millionth Macintosh computer, with an engraved brass plaque on the front.

=== Pioneering the information appliance ===
Raskin left Apple in 1982 and formed Information Appliance, Inc. to implement some elements of his original Macintosh concept. The first product was the SwyftCard, a firmware card for the Apple II containing an integrated application suite, also released on a disk as SwyftWare. Information Appliance later developed the Swyft as a stand-alone laptop computer. Raskin licensed this design to Canon, which shipped a similar desktop product as the Canon Cat. Released in 1987, the unit had an innovative interface that attracted much interest but it did not become a commercial success. Raskin claimed that its failure was due in some part to Steve Jobs, who successfully pitched Canon on the NeXT Computer at about the same time. It has also been suggested that Canon canceled the Cat due to internal rivalries within its divisions. After running a cryptic full-page advertisement in The Wall Street Journal that the "Canon Cat is coming" months before it was available, Canon failed to follow through, never airing the completed TV advertisement at launch, only allowed the Cat to be sold by its typewriter sales people, and prevented Raskin from selling the Cat directly with a TV demonstration of how easy it was to use. Shortly thereafter, the stock market crash of 1987 so panicked Information Appliance's venture capitalists that they drained millions of dollars from the company, depriving it of the capital needed to be able to manufacture and sell the Swyft.

Raskin wrote a book, The Humane Interface (2000), in which he developed his ideas about human-computer interfaces.

Raskin was a long-time member of BAYCHI, the Bay-Area Computer-Human Interface group, a professional organization for human-interface designers. He presented papers on his own work, reviewed the human interfaces of various consumer products (such as a BMW car he'd been asked to review), and discussed the work of his colleagues in various companies and universities.

At the start of the new millennium, Raskin undertook the building of a new computer interface based on his 30 years of work and research, called The Humane Environment, THE. On January 1, 2005, he renamed it Archy. It is a system incarnating his concepts of the humane interface, by using open source elements within his rendition of a ZUI or Zooming User Interface. In the same period, Raskin accepted an appointment as adjunct professor of computer science at the University of Chicago's Computer Science Department and, with Leo Irakliotis, started designing a new curriculum on humane interfaces and computer enterprises.

His work is being extended and carried on by his son Aza Raskin at Humanized, a company that was started shortly after Raskin's death to continue his legacy. Humanized released Enso, a linguistic command-line interface, which is based on Jef's work and dedicated in his memory. In early 2008, Humanized became part of Mozilla.

The Archy project never included a functional ZUI, but a third party developed a commercial application called Raskin inspired by the same Zoomworld ZUI idea.

==== Cognetics ====
Raskin expanded the meaning of the term "cognetics" in his book The Humane Interface to mean "the ergonomics of the mind". According to Raskin Center, "Cognetics brings interface design out of the mystic realm of guruism, transforming it into an engineering discipline with a rigorous theoretical framework."

The term cognetics had earlier been coined and trademarked by Charles Kreitzberg in 1982 when he started Cognetics Corporation, one of the first user experience design companies. It is also used to describe educational programs intended to foster thinking skills in grades 3–12 (US) and for Cognetics, Inc., an economic research firm founded by David L. Birch, a professor at MIT.

Raskin discouraged using the informal term "intuitive" in user interface design, claiming that easy to use interfaces are often due to exposure to previous, similar systems, thus the term "familiar" should be preferred. Aiming for "intuitive" interfaces (based on reusing existing skills with interaction systems) could lead designers to discard a better design solution only because it would require a novel approach.

== Outside interests ==
Raskin had interests other than computers. He conducted the San Francisco Chamber Opera Society and played various instruments, including the organ and the recorder. His artwork was displayed at New York's Museum of Modern Art as part of its permanent collection, the Los Angeles County Museum of Art, and the University of California, San Diego. He received a patent for airplane wing construction, and designed and marketed radio controlled model gliders.

He was an accomplished archer, target shooter, bicycle racer and an occasional model race car driver. He was a musician and composer, publishing a series of collected recorder studies using the pseudonym of Aabel Aabius. In his later years he also wrote freelance articles for Macintosh magazines, such as Mac Home Journal, and many modeling magazines, Forbes, Wired, and computing journals. One of his favorite pastimes was to play music with his children. He accompanied them on the piano while they played or sang while going through old fake-books passed down from his father. They routinely improvised together.

Raskin owned Jef's Friends, a small company which made model airplane kits.

He was a toy designer. He designed Space Expander, a hanging cloth maze for a person to walk through. He designed Bloxes, a set of interlocking wood blocks.

One of Raskin's instruments was the organ. In 1978 he published an article in BYTE on using computers with the instrument.

Raskin published a paper highly critical of pseudoscience in nursing, such as therapeutic touch and Rogerian science, wherein he said: "Unlike science, nursing theory has no built-in mechanisms for rejecting falsehoods, tautologies, and irrelevancies."

== Personal life ==
Jef Raskin married Linda S. Blum in 1982. They had three children together—Aza, Aviva, and Aenea, with honorary surrogate siblings R. Fureigh and Jenna Mandis. In 1985, Raskin described his house as "practically one large playground", with secret doors and passageways, an auditorium that seats 185, and a model airplane room. He said, "I decided when I grew up I was not going to give up the things I liked doing, and I've not."

He was diagnosed with pancreatic cancer in December 2004 and died in Pacifica, California, on February 26, 2005, at age 61.

== See also ==
- Information appliance
