= Canon Cat =

Desktop computer by Canon

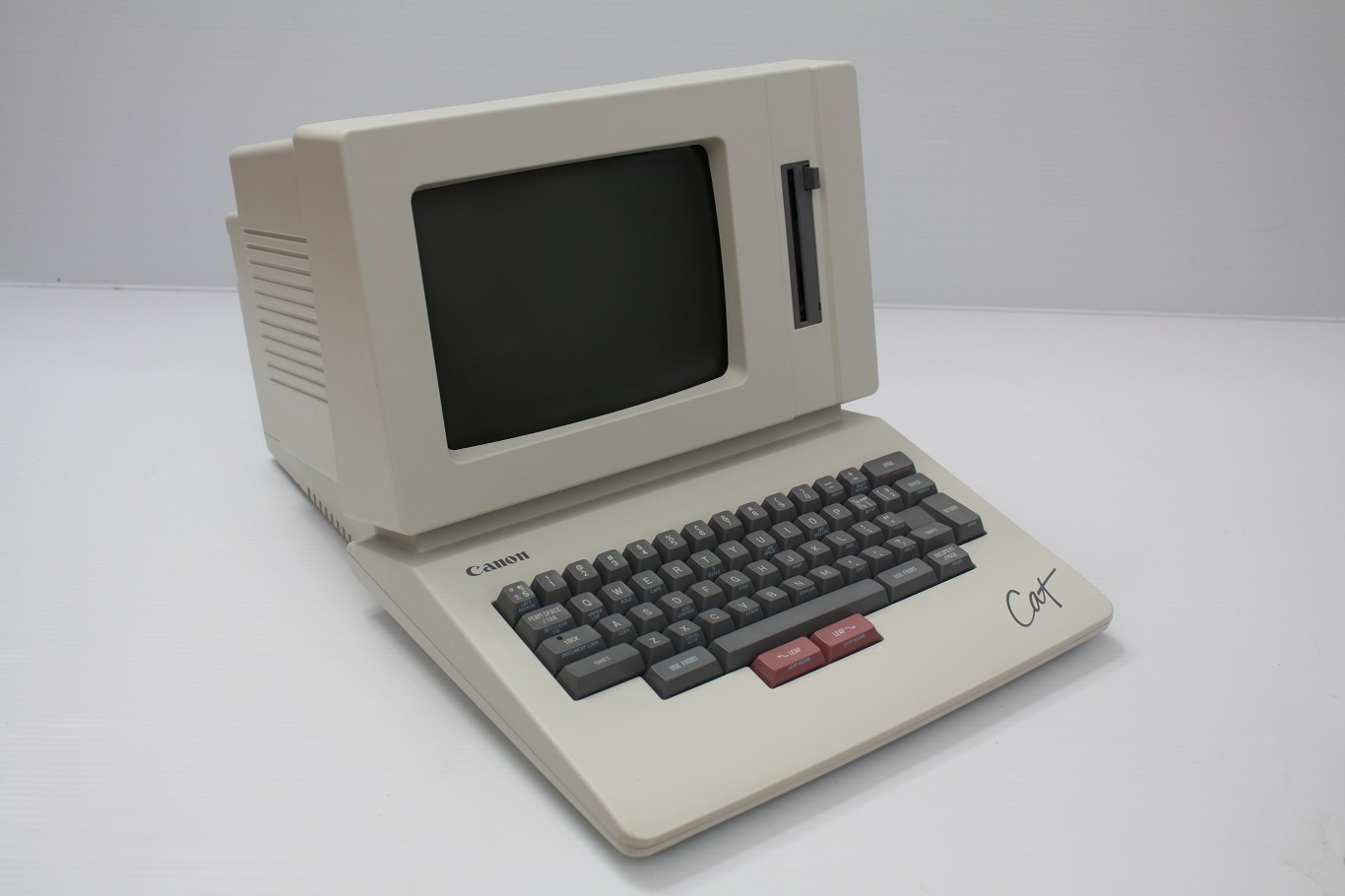
- Developer: Information Appliance, Inc.
- Manufacturer: Canon
- Type: Task-dedicated single-unit desktop computer
- Released: 1987; 39 years ago
- Introductory price: US$1,495 (equivalent to $4,200 in 2025)
- Discontinued: 1987; 39 years ago
- Units sold: 20,000 units
- Operating system: Forth
- CPU: Motorola 68000 @ 5 MHz
- Memory: 256 KB of RAM
- Storage: 3½-inch 256 KB floppy disk drive
- Display: 9-inch (229 mm) black-and-white monitor
- Graphics: 80 × 24 characters, 672 × 344 pixels
- Connectivity: Internal 300/1200 bit/s modem
- Weight: 17 pounds (7.7 kg)

The Canon Cat was a task-dedicated microcomputer released by Canon Inc. in 1987 for $1,495 (equivalent to $4,200 in 2025). Its appearance resembles dedicated word processors of the late 1970s to early 1980s, but it was more powerful, and had ideas for data manipulation.

The system was primarily the creation of Jef Raskin, who originated the Macintosh project at Apple. After leaving the company in 1982 and founding Information Appliance, Inc., he began designing a new computer closer to his original vision of an inexpensive, utilitarian "people's computer". Information Appliance first developed the SwyftCard for the Apple II, then licensed it to Canon as the Cat. BYTE in 1987 described the Cat as "a spiritual heir to the Macintosh".

== Overview ==
The Canon Cat used a text-based user interface, without any pointer, mouse, icons, or graphics. All data was seen as a long "stream" of text broken into several pages. Instead of using a traditional command-line interface or menu system, the Cat used its special keyboard, with commands activated by holding down a "Use Front" key and pressing another key. Special "Leap keys" are held down to allow the user incremental search for strings of characters.

The hardware consisted of a 9-inch (229 mm) black-and-white monitor (80 x 24 character display, 672 x 344 resolution), a single 3½-inch 256 KB floppy disk drive, and an IBM Selectric–compatible keyboard. It uses a Motorola 68000 CPU (like the Macintosh) running at 5 MHz, has 256 KB of RAM, and an internal 300/1200 bit/s modem. Setup and user preference data are stored in 8 KB of non-volatile RAM with battery backup. The array of I/O interfaces encompasses one Centronics parallel port, one RS-232C serial port (DB-25), and two RJ11 telephone jacks for the modem loop. The total weight is 17 pounds (7.7 kg).

A range of application software was built into 256 KB of ROM: a standard office suite, telecommunications, a 90,000-word spelling dictionary, and user programming toolchains for Forth and assembly language.

Graphics routines were in ROM, and connectors for a mouse or other pointing device were never used.

== Reception ==
In a 1989 review for BYTE, Ezra Shapiro praised the Cat, declaring it to be "perfect for someone who needs industrial-strength editing and record keeping but doesn't require a full-blown computer system ... It's as close to perfect integration, on a small scale, as I've encountered to date".

== Legacy ==
Archy, originally called The Humane Environment, was a project initiated by Raskin in 2005 with similar principles to the Canon Cat.

== See also ==
- Jupiter Ace, British home computer of the early 1980s that uses Forth
