= Miscellaneous Symbols and Pictographs =

- Range: U+1F300..U+1F5FF (768 code points)
- Plane: SMP
- Scripts: Common
- Symbol sets: Emoji
- Assigned: 768 code points
- Unused: 0 reserved code points

Unicode Version History
- 6.0 (2010): 529 (+529)
- 6.1 (2012): 533 (+4)
- 7.0 (2014): 742 (+209)
- 8.0 (2015): 766 (+24)
- 9.0 (2016): 768 (+2)

Unicode documentation
- Code chart ∣ Web page

Miscellaneous Symbols and Pictographs is a Unicode block containing meteorological and astronomical symbols, emoji characters largely for compatibility with Japanese telephone carriers' implementations of Shift JIS, and characters originally from the Wingdings and Webdings fonts found in Microsoft Windows.

== Block ==
Miscellaneous Symbols and Pictographs^{[1]} Official Unicode Consortium code chart (PDF)
	0	1	2	3	4	5	6	7	8	9	A	B	C	D	E	F
U+1F30x	🌀	🌁	🌂	🌃	🌄	🌅	🌆	🌇	🌈	🌉	🌊	🌋	🌌	🌍	🌎	🌏
U+1F31x	🌐	🌑	🌒	🌓	🌔	🌕	🌖	🌗	🌘	🌙	🌚	🌛	🌜	🌝	🌞	🌟
U+1F32x	🌠	🌡	🌢	🌣	🌤	🌥	🌦	🌧	🌨	🌩	🌪	🌫	🌬	🌭	🌮	🌯
U+1F33x	🌰	🌱	🌲	🌳	🌴	🌵	🌶	🌷	🌸	🌹	🌺	🌻	🌼	🌽	🌾	🌿
U+1F34x	🍀	🍁	🍂	🍃	🍄	🍅	🍆	🍇	🍈	🍉	🍊	🍋	🍌	🍍	🍎	🍏
U+1F35x	🍐	🍑	🍒	🍓	🍔	🍕	🍖	🍗	🍘	🍙	🍚	🍛	🍜	🍝	🍞	🍟
U+1F36x	🍠	🍡	🍢	🍣	🍤	🍥	🍦	🍧	🍨	🍩	🍪	🍫	🍬	🍭	🍮	🍯
U+1F37x	🍰	🍱	🍲	🍳	🍴	🍵	🍶	🍷	🍸	🍹	🍺	🍻	🍼	🍽	🍾	🍿
U+1F38x	🎀	🎁	🎂	🎃	🎄	🎅	🎆	🎇	🎈	🎉	🎊	🎋	🎌	🎍	🎎	🎏
U+1F39x	🎐	🎑	🎒	🎓	🎔	🎕	🎖	🎗	🎘	🎙	🎚	🎛	🎜	🎝	🎞	🎟
U+1F3Ax	🎠	🎡	🎢	🎣	🎤	🎥	🎦	🎧	🎨	🎩	🎪	🎫	🎬	🎭	🎮	🎯
U+1F3Bx	🎰	🎱	🎲	🎳	🎴	🎵	🎶	🎷	🎸	🎹	🎺	🎻	🎼	🎽	🎾	🎿
U+1F3Cx	🏀	🏁	🏂	🏃	🏄	🏅	🏆	🏇	🏈	🏉	🏊	🏋	🏌	🏍	🏎	🏏
U+1F3Dx	🏐	🏑	🏒	🏓	🏔	🏕	🏖	🏗	🏘	🏙	🏚	🏛	🏜	🏝	🏞	🏟
U+1F3Ex	🏠	🏡	🏢	🏣	🏤	🏥	🏦	🏧	🏨	🏩	🏪	🏫	🏬	🏭	🏮	🏯
U+1F3Fx	🏰	🏱	🏲	🏳	🏴	🏵	🏶	🏷	🏸	🏹	🏺	🏻	🏼	🏽	🏾	🏿
U+1F40x	🐀	🐁	🐂	🐃	🐄	🐅	🐆	🐇	🐈	🐉	🐊	🐋	🐌	🐍	🐎	🐏
U+1F41x	🐐	🐑	🐒	🐓	🐔	🐕	🐖	🐗	🐘	🐙	🐚	🐛	🐜	🐝	🐞	🐟
U+1F42x	🐠	🐡	🐢	🐣	🐤	🐥	🐦	🐧	🐨	🐩	🐪	🐫	🐬	🐭	🐮	🐯
U+1F43x	🐰	🐱	🐲	🐳	🐴	🐵	🐶	🐷	🐸	🐹	🐺	🐻	🐼	🐽	🐾	🐿
U+1F44x	👀	👁	👂	👃	👄	👅	👆	👇	👈	👉	👊	👋	👌	👍	👎	👏
U+1F45x	👐	👑	👒	👓	👔	👕	👖	👗	👘	👙	👚	👛	👜	👝	👞	👟
U+1F46x	👠	👡	👢	👣	👤	👥	👦	👧	👨	👩	👪	👫	👬	👭	👮	👯
U+1F47x	👰	👱	👲	👳	👴	👵	👶	👷	👸	👹	👺	👻	👼	👽	👾	👿
U+1F48x	💀	💁	💂	💃	💄	💅	💆	💇	💈	💉	💊	💋	💌	💍	💎	💏
U+1F49x	💐	💑	💒	💓	💔	💕	💖	💗	💘	💙	💚	💛	💜	💝	💞	💟
U+1F4Ax	💠	💡	💢	💣	💤	💥	💦	💧	💨	💩	💪	💫	💬	💭	💮	💯
U+1F4Bx	💰	💱	💲	💳	💴	💵	💶	💷	💸	💹	💺	💻	💼	💽	💾	💿
U+1F4Cx	📀	📁	📂	📃	📄	📅	📆	📇	📈	📉	📊	📋	📌	📍	📎	📏
U+1F4Dx	📐	📑	📒	📓	📔	📕	📖	📗	📘	📙	📚	📛	📜	📝	📞	📟
U+1F4Ex	📠	📡	📢	📣	📤	📥	📦	📧	📨	📩	📪	📫	📬	📭	📮	📯
U+1F4Fx	📰	📱	📲	📳	📴	📵	📶	📷	📸	📹	📺	📻	📼	📽	📾	📿
U+1F50x	🔀	🔁	🔂	🔃	🔄	🔅	🔆	🔇	🔈	🔉	🔊	🔋	🔌	🔍	🔎	🔏
U+1F51x	🔐	🔑	🔒	🔓	🔔	🔕	🔖	🔗	🔘	🔙	🔚	🔛	🔜	🔝	🔞	🔟
U+1F52x	🔠	🔡	🔢	🔣	🔤	🔥	🔦	🔧	🔨	🔩	🔪	🔫	🔬	🔭	🔮	🔯
U+1F53x	🔰	🔱	🔲	🔳	🔴	🔵	🔶	🔷	🔸	🔹	🔺	🔻	🔼	🔽	🔾	🔿
U+1F54x	🕀	🕁	🕂	🕃	🕄	🕅	🕆	🕇	🕈	🕉	🕊	🕋	🕌	🕍	🕎	🕏
U+1F55x	🕐	🕑	🕒	🕓	🕔	🕕	🕖	🕗	🕘	🕙	🕚	🕛	🕜	🕝	🕞	🕟
U+1F56x	🕠	🕡	🕢	🕣	🕤	🕥	🕦	🕧	🕨	🕩	🕪	🕫	🕬	🕭	🕮	🕯
U+1F57x	🕰	🕱	🕲	🕳	🕴	🕵	🕶	🕷	🕸	🕹	🕺	🕻	🕼	🕽	🕾	🕿
U+1F58x	🖀	🖁	🖂	🖃	🖄	🖅	🖆	🖇	🖈	🖉	🖊	🖋	🖌	🖍	🖎	🖏
U+1F59x	🖐	🖑	🖒	🖓	🖔	🖕	🖖	🖗	🖘	🖙	🖚	🖛	🖜	🖝	🖞	🖟
U+1F5Ax	🖠	🖡	🖢	🖣	🖤	🖥	🖦	🖧	🖨	🖩	🖪	🖫	🖬	🖭	🖮	🖯
U+1F5Bx	🖰	🖱	🖲	🖳	🖴	🖵	🖶	🖷	🖸	🖹	🖺	🖻	🖼	🖽	🖾	🖿
U+1F5Cx	🗀	🗁	🗂	🗃	🗄	🗅	🗆	🗇	🗈	🗉	🗊	🗋	🗌	🗍	🗎	🗏
U+1F5Dx	🗐	🗑	🗒	🗓	🗔	🗕	🗖	🗗	🗘	🗙	🗚	🗛	🗜	🗝	🗞	🗟
U+1F5Ex	🗠	🗡	🗢	🗣	🗤	🗥	🗦	🗧	🗨	🗩	🗪	🗫	🗬	🗭	🗮	🗯
U+1F5Fx	🗰	🗱	🗲	🗳	🗴	🗵	🗶	🗷	🗸	🗹	🗺	🗻	🗼	🗽	🗾	🗿
Notes 1.As of Unicode version 18.0

== Emoji ==
The block contains 637 emoji and has 312 standardized variants defined to specify emoji-style (U+FE0F VS16) or text presentation (U+FE0E VS15) for 156 base characters.

Emoji variation sequences
U+	1F30D	1F30E	1F30F	1F315	1F31C	1F321	1F324	1F325	1F326	1F327	1F328	1F329
default presentation	emoji	emoji	emoji	emoji	emoji	text	text	text	text	text	text	text
base code point	🌍	🌎	🌏	🌕	🌜	🌡	🌤	🌥	🌦	🌧	🌨	🌩
base+VS15 (text)	🌍︎	🌎︎	🌏︎	🌕︎	🌜︎	🌡︎	🌤︎	🌥︎	🌦︎	🌧︎	🌨︎	🌩︎
base+VS16 (emoji)	🌍️	🌎️	🌏️	🌕️	🌜️	🌡️	🌤️	🌥️	🌦️	🌧️	🌨️	🌩️
U+	1F32A	1F32B	1F32C	1F336	1F378	1F37D	1F393	1F396	1F397	1F399	1F39A	1F39B
default presentation	text	text	text	text	emoji	text	emoji	text	text	text	text	text
base code point	🌪	🌫	🌬	🌶	🍸	🍽	🎓	🎖	🎗	🎙	🎚	🎛
base+VS15 (text)	🌪︎	🌫︎	🌬︎	🌶︎	🍸︎	🍽︎	🎓︎	🎖︎	🎗︎	🎙︎	🎚︎	🎛︎
base+VS16 (emoji)	🌪️	🌫️	🌬️	🌶️	🍸️	🍽️	🎓️	🎖️	🎗️	🎙️	🎚️	🎛️
U+	1F39E	1F39F	1F3A7	1F3AC	1F3AD	1F3AE	1F3C2	1F3C4	1F3C6	1F3CA	1F3CB	1F3CC
default presentation	text	text	emoji	emoji	emoji	emoji	emoji	emoji	emoji	emoji	text	text
base code point	🎞	🎟	🎧	🎬	🎭	🎮	🏂	🏄	🏆	🏊	🏋	🏌
base+VS15 (text)	🎞︎	🎟︎	🎧︎	🎬︎	🎭︎	🎮︎	🏂︎	🏄︎	🏆︎	🏊︎	🏋︎	🏌︎
base+VS16 (emoji)	🎞️	🎟️	🎧️	🎬️	🎭️	🎮️	🏂️	🏄️	🏆️	🏊️	🏋️	🏌️
U+	1F3CD	1F3CE	1F3D4	1F3D5	1F3D6	1F3D7	1F3D8	1F3D9	1F3DA	1F3DB	1F3DC	1F3DD
default presentation	text	text	text	text	text	text	text	text	text	text	text	text
base code point	🏍	🏎	🏔	🏕	🏖	🏗	🏘	🏙	🏚	🏛	🏜	🏝
base+VS15 (text)	🏍︎	🏎︎	🏔︎	🏕︎	🏖︎	🏗︎	🏘︎	🏙︎	🏚︎	🏛︎	🏜︎	🏝︎
base+VS16 (emoji)	🏍️	🏎️	🏔️	🏕️	🏖️	🏗️	🏘️	🏙️	🏚️	🏛️	🏜️	🏝️
U+	1F3DE	1F3DF	1F3E0	1F3ED	1F3F3	1F3F5	1F3F7	1F408	1F415	1F41F	1F426	1F43F
default presentation	text	text	emoji	emoji	text	text	text	emoji	emoji	emoji	emoji	text
base code point	🏞	🏟	🏠	🏭	🏳	🏵	🏷	🐈	🐕	🐟	🐦	🐿
base+VS15 (text)	🏞︎	🏟︎	🏠︎	🏭︎	🏳︎	🏵︎	🏷︎	🐈︎	🐕︎	🐟︎	🐦︎	🐿︎
base+VS16 (emoji)	🏞️	🏟️	🏠️	🏭️	🏳️	🏵️	🏷️	🐈️	🐕️	🐟️	🐦️	🐿️
U+	1F441	1F442	1F446	1F447	1F448	1F449	1F44D	1F44E	1F453	1F46A	1F47D	1F4A3
default presentation	text	emoji	emoji	emoji	emoji	emoji	emoji	emoji	emoji	emoji	emoji	emoji
base code point	👁	👂	👆	👇	👈	👉	👍	👎	👓	👪	👽	💣
base+VS15 (text)	👁︎	👂︎	👆︎	👇︎	👈︎	👉︎	👍︎	👎︎	👓︎	👪︎	👽︎	💣︎
base+VS16 (emoji)	👁️	👂️	👆️	👇️	👈️	👉️	👍️	👎️	👓️	👪️	👽️	💣️
U+	1F4B0	1F4B3	1F4BB	1F4BF	1F4CB	1F4DA	1F4DF	1F4E4	1F4E5	1F4E6	1F4EA	1F4EB
default presentation	emoji	emoji	emoji	emoji	emoji	emoji	emoji	emoji	emoji	emoji	emoji	emoji
base code point	💰	💳	💻	💿	📋	📚	📟	📤	📥	📦	📪	📫
base+VS15 (text)	💰︎	💳︎	💻︎	💿︎	📋︎	📚︎	📟︎	📤︎	📥︎	📦︎	📪︎	📫︎
base+VS16 (emoji)	💰️	💳️	💻️	💿️	📋️	📚️	📟️	📤️	📥️	📦️	📪️	📫️
U+	1F4EC	1F4ED	1F4F7	1F4F9	1F4FA	1F4FB	1F4FD	1F508	1F50D	1F512	1F513	1F549
default presentation	emoji	emoji	emoji	emoji	emoji	emoji	text	emoji	emoji	emoji	emoji	text
base code point	📬	📭	📷	📹	📺	📻	📽	🔈	🔍	🔒	🔓	🕉
base+VS15 (text)	📬︎	📭︎	📷︎	📹︎	📺︎	📻︎	📽︎	🔈︎	🔍︎	🔒︎	🔓︎	🕉︎
base+VS16 (emoji)	📬️	📭️	📷️	📹️	📺️	📻️	📽️	🔈️	🔍️	🔒️	🔓️	🕉️
U+	1F54A	1F550	1F551	1F552	1F553	1F554	1F555	1F556	1F557	1F558	1F559	1F55A
default presentation	text	emoji	emoji	emoji	emoji	emoji	emoji	emoji	emoji	emoji	emoji	emoji
base code point	🕊	🕐	🕑	🕒	🕓	🕔	🕕	🕖	🕗	🕘	🕙	🕚
base+VS15 (text)	🕊︎	🕐︎	🕑︎	🕒︎	🕓︎	🕔︎	🕕︎	🕖︎	🕗︎	🕘︎	🕙︎	🕚︎
base+VS16 (emoji)	🕊️	🕐️	🕑️	🕒️	🕓️	🕔️	🕕️	🕖️	🕗️	🕘️	🕙️	🕚️
U+	1F55B	1F55C	1F55D	1F55E	1F55F	1F560	1F561	1F562	1F563	1F564	1F565	1F566
default presentation	emoji	emoji	emoji	emoji	emoji	emoji	emoji	emoji	emoji	emoji	emoji	emoji
base code point	🕛	🕜	🕝	🕞	🕟	🕠	🕡	🕢	🕣	🕤	🕥	🕦
base+VS15 (text)	🕛︎	🕜︎	🕝︎	🕞︎	🕟︎	🕠︎	🕡︎	🕢︎	🕣︎	🕤︎	🕥︎	🕦︎
base+VS16 (emoji)	🕛️	🕜️	🕝️	🕞️	🕟️	🕠️	🕡️	🕢️	🕣️	🕤️	🕥️	🕦️
U+	1F567	1F56F	1F570	1F573	1F574	1F575	1F576	1F577	1F578	1F579	1F587	1F58A
default presentation	emoji	text	text	text	text	text	text	text	text	text	text	text
base code point	🕧	🕯	🕰	🕳	🕴	🕵	🕶	🕷	🕸	🕹	🖇	🖊
base+VS15 (text)	🕧︎	🕯︎	🕰︎	🕳︎	🕴︎	🕵︎	🕶︎	🕷︎	🕸︎	🕹︎	🖇︎	🖊︎
base+VS16 (emoji)	🕧️	🕯️	🕰️	🕳️	🕴️	🕵️	🕶️	🕷️	🕸️	🕹️	🖇️	🖊️
U+	1F58B	1F58C	1F58D	1F590	1F5A5	1F5A8	1F5B1	1F5B2	1F5BC	1F5C2	1F5C3	1F5C4
default presentation	text	text	text	text	text	text	text	text	text	text	text	text
base code point	🖋	🖌	🖍	🖐	🖥	🖨	🖱	🖲	🖼	🗂	🗃	🗄
base+VS15 (text)	🖋︎	🖌︎	🖍︎	🖐︎	🖥︎	🖨︎	🖱︎	🖲︎	🖼︎	🗂︎	🗃︎	🗄︎
base+VS16 (emoji)	🖋️	🖌️	🖍️	🖐️	🖥️	🖨️	🖱️	🖲️	🖼️	🗂️	🗃️	🗄️
U+	1F5D1	1F5D2	1F5D3	1F5DC	1F5DD	1F5DE	1F5E1	1F5E3	1F5E8	1F5EF	1F5F3	1F5FA
default presentation	text	text	text	text	text	text	text	text	text	text	text	text
base code point	🗑	🗒	🗓	🗜	🗝	🗞	🗡	🗣	🗨	🗯	🗳	🗺
base+VS15 (text)	🗑︎	🗒︎	🗓︎	🗜︎	🗝︎	🗞︎	🗡︎	🗣︎	🗨︎	🗯︎	🗳︎	🗺︎
base+VS16 (emoji)	🗑️	🗒️	🗓️	🗜️	🗝️	🗞️	🗡️	🗣️	🗨️	🗯️	🗳️	🗺️

== Emoji modifiers ==
The Miscellaneous Symbols and Pictographs contains a set of "Emoji modifiers" which are modifier characters intended to represent skin colour based on the Fitzpatrick scale (but conflating the two lightest skin types into one category):

U+1F3FB 🏻 EMOJI MODIFIER FITZPATRICK TYPE-1-2
U+1F3FC 🏼 EMOJI MODIFIER FITZPATRICK TYPE-3
U+1F3FD 🏽 EMOJI MODIFIER FITZPATRICK TYPE-4
U+1F3FE 🏾 EMOJI MODIFIER FITZPATRICK TYPE-5
U+1F3FF 🏿 EMOJI MODIFIER FITZPATRICK TYPE-6

These emoji modifiers can be used on emojis that represent people or body parts including the 55 human emojis in the Miscellaneous Symbols and Pictograph block.

In August 2014, Peter Edberg of Apple Inc. and Mark Davis of Google proposed implementing these "emoji modifiers" to provide better representation of "human diversity" in emoji characters. and, in June 2015, the proposal was adopted in Unicode version 8.0. This was the result of lobbying by Katrina Parrott, whose daughter came up with the idea after being unable to send emojis that looked like her.

To modify an emoji representing a human or body part, the emoji modifier must be placed immediately after that emoji. When the emoji modifier is applied to an emoji, the emoji-style variant selectior (U+FE0F) should be omitted because the emoji modifier automatically implies emoji-style presentation.

=== Table of emoji with modifiers ===
The following table shows the full combinations of each of the five modifiers with all the "human emoji" characters in the Miscellaneous Symbols and Pictographs block. Each character should show in each of the five skin tones provided a suitable font is installed on the system and the rendering software is capable of handling modifier characters. Platforms without emoji modifier support may show as boxes.

Human emoji
U+	1F385	1F3C2	1F3C3	1F3C4	1F3C7	1F3CA	1F3CB	1F3CC	1F442	1F443	1F446
emoji	🎅	🏂	🏃	🏄	🏇	🏊	🏋️	🏌️	👂	👃	👆
FITZ-1-2	🎅🏻	🏂🏻	🏃🏻	🏄🏻	🏇🏻	🏊🏻	🏋🏻	🏌🏻	👂🏻	👃🏻	👆🏻
FITZ-3	🎅🏼	🏂🏼	🏃🏼	🏄🏼	🏇🏼	🏊🏼	🏋🏼	🏌🏼	👂🏼	👃🏼	👆🏼
FITZ-4	🎅🏽	🏂🏽	🏃🏽	🏄🏽	🏇🏽	🏊🏽	🏋🏽	🏌🏽	👂🏽	👃🏽	👆🏽
FITZ-5	🎅🏾	🏂🏾	🏃🏾	🏄🏾	🏇🏾	🏊🏾	🏋🏾	🏌🏾	👂🏾	👃🏾	👆🏾
FITZ-6	🎅🏿	🏂🏿	🏃🏿	🏄🏿	🏇🏿	🏊🏿	🏋🏿	🏌🏿	👂🏿	👃🏿	👆🏿
U+	1F447	1F448	1F449	1F44A	1F44B	1F44C	1F44D	1F44E	1F44F	1F450	1F466
emoji	👇	👈	👉	👊	👋	👌	👍	👎	👏	👐	👦
FITZ-1-2	👇🏻	👈🏻	👉🏻	👊🏻	👋🏻	👌🏻	👍🏻	👎🏻	👏🏻	👐🏻	👦🏻
FITZ-3	👇🏼	👈🏼	👉🏼	👊🏼	👋🏼	👌🏼	👍🏼	👎🏼	👏🏼	👐🏼	👦🏼
FITZ-4	👇🏽	👈🏽	👉🏽	👊🏽	👋🏽	👌🏽	👍🏽	👎🏽	👏🏽	👐🏽	👦🏽
FITZ-5	👇🏾	👈🏾	👉🏾	👊🏾	👋🏾	👌🏾	👍🏾	👎🏾	👏🏾	👐🏾	👦🏾
FITZ-6	👇🏿	👈🏿	👉🏿	👊🏿	👋🏿	👌🏿	👍🏿	👎🏿	👏🏿	👐🏿	👦🏿
U+	1F467	1F468	1F469	1F46B	1F46C	1F46D	1F46E	1F46F	1F470	1F471	1F472
emoji	👧	👨	👩	👫	👬	👭	👮	👯	👰	👱	👲
FITZ-1-2	👧🏻	👨🏻	👩🏻	👫🏻	👬🏻	👭🏻	👮🏻	👯🏻	👰🏻	👱🏻	👲🏻
FITZ-3	👧🏼	👨🏼	👩🏼	👫🏼	👬🏼	👭🏼	👮🏼	👯🏼	👰🏼	👱🏼	👲🏼
FITZ-4	👧🏽	👨🏽	👩🏽	👫🏽	👬🏽	👭🏽	👮🏽	👯🏽	👰🏽	👱🏽	👲🏽
FITZ-5	👧🏾	👨🏾	👩🏾	👫🏾	👬🏾	👭🏾	👮🏾	👯🏾	👰🏾	👱🏾	👲🏾
FITZ-6	👧🏿	👨🏿	👩🏿	👫🏿	👬🏿	👭🏿	👮🏿	👯🏿	👰🏿	👱🏿	👲🏿
U+	1F473	1F474	1F475	1F476	1F477	1F478	1F47C	1F481	1F482	1F483	1F485
emoji	👳	👴	👵	👶	👷	👸	👼	💁	💂	💃	💅
FITZ-1-2	👳🏻	👴🏻	👵🏻	👶🏻	👷🏻	👸🏻	👼🏻	💁🏻	💂🏻	💃🏻	💅🏻
FITZ-3	👳🏼	👴🏼	👵🏼	👶🏼	👷🏼	👸🏼	👼🏼	💁🏼	💂🏼	💃🏼	💅🏼
FITZ-4	👳🏽	👴🏽	👵🏽	👶🏽	👷🏽	👸🏽	👼🏽	💁🏽	💂🏽	💃🏽	💅🏽
FITZ-5	👳🏾	👴🏾	👵🏾	👶🏾	👷🏾	👸🏾	👼🏾	💁🏾	💂🏾	💃🏾	💅🏾
FITZ-6	👳🏿	👴🏿	👵🏿	👶🏿	👷🏿	👸🏿	👼🏿	💁🏿	💂🏿	💃🏿	💅🏿
U+	1F486	1F487	1F48F	1F491	1F4AA	1F574	1F575	1F57A	1F590	1F595	1F596
emoji	💆	💇	💏	💑	💪	🕴️	🕵️	🕺	🖐️	🖕	🖖
FITZ-1-2	💆🏻	💇🏻	💏🏻	💑🏻	💪🏻	🕴🏻	🕵🏻	🕺🏻	🖐🏻	🖕🏻	🖖🏻
FITZ-3	💆🏼	💇🏼	💏🏼	💑🏼	💪🏼	🕴🏼	🕵🏼	🕺🏼	🖐🏼	🖕🏼	🖖🏼
FITZ-4	💆🏽	💇🏽	💏🏽	💑🏽	💪🏽	🕴🏽	🕵🏽	🕺🏽	🖐🏽	🖕🏽	🖖🏽
FITZ-5	💆🏾	💇🏾	💏🏾	💑🏾	💪🏾	🕴🏾	🕵🏾	🕺🏾	🖐🏾	🖕🏾	🖖🏾
FITZ-6	💆🏿	💇🏿	💏🏿	💑🏿	💪🏿	🕴🏿	🕵🏿	🕺🏿	🖐🏿	🖕🏿	🖖🏿

Additional human emoji can be found in other Unicode blocks: Dingbats, Emoticons, Miscellaneous Symbols, Supplemental Symbols and Pictographs, Symbols and Pictographs Extended-A and Transport and Map Symbols.

== History ==
The following Unicode-related documents record the purpose and process of defining specific characters in the Miscellaneous Symbols and Pictographs block:

Version	Final code points (Note: Proposed code points and characters names may differ from final code points and names)	Count	L2 ID	WG2 ID	Document
6.0	U+1F300..1F320, 1F330..1F335, 1F337..1F37C, 1F380..1F393, 1F3A0..1F3C4, 1F3C6..1F3CA, 1F3E0..1F3F0, 1F400..1F43E, 1F440, 1F442..1F4F7, 1F4F9..1F4FC, 1F500..1F53D, 1F550..1F567, 1F5FB..1F5FF	529	L2/00-152		Asher, Graham (26 April 2000), NTT DoCoMo Pictographs
6.0	U+1F300..1F320, 1F330..1F335, 1F337..1F37C, 1F380..1F393, 1F3A0..1F3C4, 1F3C6..1F3CA, 1F3E0..1F3F0, 1F400..1F43E, 1F440, 1F442..1F4F7, 1F4F9..1F4FC, 1F500..1F53D, 1F550..1F567, 1F5FB..1F5FF	529	L2/00-201		French, Howard W. (12 June 2000), E-mail a huge hit among Japanese cell-phone users
6.0	U+1F300..1F320, 1F330..1F335, 1F337..1F37C, 1F380..1F393, 1F3A0..1F3C4, 1F3C6..1F3CA, 1F3E0..1F3F0, 1F400..1F43E, 1F440, 1F442..1F4F7, 1F4F9..1F4FC, 1F500..1F53D, 1F550..1F567, 1F5FB..1F5FF	529	L2/06-369		Davis, Mark (1 November 2006), Symbols
6.0	U+1F300..1F320, 1F330..1F335, 1F337..1F37C, 1F380..1F393, 1F3A0..1F3C4, 1F3C6..1F3CA, 1F3E0..1F3F0, 1F400..1F43E, 1F440, 1F442..1F4F7, 1F4F9..1F4FC, 1F500..1F53D, 1F550..1F567, 1F5FB..1F5FF	529	L2/06-380		Goldsmith, Deborah (6 November 2006), Apple Symbols
6.0	U+1F300..1F320, 1F330..1F335, 1F337..1F37C, 1F380..1F393, 1F3A0..1F3C4, 1F3C6..1F3CA, 1F3E0..1F3F0, 1F400..1F43E, 1F440, 1F442..1F4F7, 1F4F9..1F4FC, 1F500..1F53D, 1F550..1F567, 1F5FB..1F5FF	529	L2/07-257 (html, zip)		Momoi, Kat; Davis, Mark; Scherer, Markus (3 August 2007), Working Draft Proposal for Encoding Emoji Symbols
6.0	U+1F300..1F320, 1F330..1F335, 1F337..1F37C, 1F380..1F393, 1F3A0..1F3C4, 1F3C6..1F3CA, 1F3E0..1F3F0, 1F400..1F43E, 1F440, 1F442..1F4F7, 1F4F9..1F4FC, 1F500..1F53D, 1F550..1F567, 1F5FB..1F5FF	529	L2/07-274R		Davis, Mark (9 August 2007), Symbols draft resolution
6.0	U+1F300..1F320, 1F330..1F335, 1F337..1F37C, 1F380..1F393, 1F3A0..1F3C4, 1F3C6..1F3CA, 1F3E0..1F3F0, 1F400..1F43E, 1F440, 1F442..1F4F7, 1F4F9..1F4FC, 1F500..1F53D, 1F550..1F567, 1F5FB..1F5FF	529	L2/08-080R (pdf, zip)		Momoi, Kat; Davis, Mark; Scherer, Markus (28 January 2008), Emoji Proposal Data
6.0	U+1F300..1F320, 1F330..1F335, 1F337..1F37C, 1F380..1F393, 1F3A0..1F3C4, 1F3C6..1F3CA, 1F3E0..1F3F0, 1F400..1F43E, 1F440, 1F442..1F4F7, 1F4F9..1F4FC, 1F500..1F53D, 1F550..1F567, 1F5FB..1F5FF	529	L2/08-081		Momoi, Kat; Davis, Mark; Scherer, Markus (28 January 2008), Working Draft Proposal (2) for Encoding Emoji Symbols
6.0	U+1F300..1F320, 1F330..1F335, 1F337..1F37C, 1F380..1F393, 1F3A0..1F3C4, 1F3C6..1F3CA, 1F3E0..1F3F0, 1F400..1F43E, 1F440, 1F442..1F4F7, 1F4F9..1F4FC, 1F500..1F53D, 1F550..1F567, 1F5FB..1F5FF	529	L2/08-106		Momoi, Kat; Scherer, Markus (5 February 2008), Feedback on the Updated Emoji Encoding Proposal (=L2/08-081)
6.0	U+1F300..1F320, 1F330..1F335, 1F337..1F37C, 1F380..1F393, 1F3A0..1F3C4, 1F3C6..1F3CA, 1F3E0..1F3F0, 1F400..1F43E, 1F440, 1F442..1F4F7, 1F4F9..1F4FC, 1F500..1F53D, 1F550..1F567, 1F5FB..1F5FF	529	L2/08-305		Pentzlin, Karl (9 August 2008), Some suggestions about the encoding of national flags as requested by the Emoji proposal (L2/08-081)
6.0	U+1F300..1F320, 1F330..1F335, 1F337..1F37C, 1F380..1F393, 1F3A0..1F3C4, 1F3C6..1F3CA, 1F3E0..1F3F0, 1F400..1F43E, 1F440, 1F442..1F4F7, 1F4F9..1F4FC, 1F500..1F53D, 1F550..1F567, 1F5FB..1F5FF	529	L2/08-309		Scherer, Markus (12 August 2008), Emoji Encoding Proposal: Progress Report
6.0	U+1F300..1F320, 1F330..1F335, 1F337..1F37C, 1F380..1F393, 1F3A0..1F3C4, 1F3C6..1F3CA, 1F3E0..1F3F0, 1F400..1F43E, 1F440, 1F442..1F4F7, 1F4F9..1F4FC, 1F500..1F53D, 1F550..1F567, 1F5FB..1F5FF	529	L2/08-314		Edberg, Peter (12 August 2008), Emoticon Core Set - working proposal
6.0	U+1F300..1F320, 1F330..1F335, 1F337..1F37C, 1F380..1F393, 1F3A0..1F3C4, 1F3C6..1F3CA, 1F3E0..1F3F0, 1F400..1F43E, 1F440, 1F442..1F4F7, 1F4F9..1F4FC, 1F500..1F53D, 1F550..1F567, 1F5FB..1F5FF	529	L2/08-315		Scherer, Markus (12 August 2008), Emoji Open Issues
6.0	U+1F300..1F320, 1F330..1F335, 1F337..1F37C, 1F380..1F393, 1F3A0..1F3C4, 1F3C6..1F3CA, 1F3E0..1F3F0, 1F400..1F43E, 1F440, 1F442..1F4F7, 1F4F9..1F4FC, 1F500..1F53D, 1F550..1F567, 1F5FB..1F5FF	529	L2/09-007		Lommel, Arle (26 December 2008), Comparison of Emoticons from Major Vendors
6.0	U+1F300..1F320, 1F330..1F335, 1F337..1F37C, 1F380..1F393, 1F3A0..1F3C4, 1F3C6..1F3CA, 1F3E0..1F3F0, 1F400..1F43E, 1F440, 1F442..1F4F7, 1F4F9..1F4FC, 1F500..1F53D, 1F550..1F567, 1F5FB..1F5FF	529	L2/09-025R2	N3582 (Note: Japanese translation of N3582 is available as N3621)	Scherer, Markus; Davis, Mark; Momoi, Kat; Tong, Darick; Kida, Yasuo; Edberg, Peter (5 March 2009), Proposal for Encoding Emoji Symbols
6.0	U+1F300..1F320, 1F330..1F335, 1F337..1F37C, 1F380..1F393, 1F3A0..1F3C4, 1F3C6..1F3CA, 1F3E0..1F3F0, 1F400..1F43E, 1F440, 1F442..1F4F7, 1F4F9..1F4FC, 1F500..1F53D, 1F550..1F567, 1F5FB..1F5FF	529	L2/09-026R	N3583	Scherer, Markus; Davis, Mark; Momoi, Kat; Tong, Darick; Kida, Yasuo; Edberg, Peter (6 February 2009), Emoji Symbols Proposed for New Encoding
6.0	U+1F300..1F320, 1F330..1F335, 1F337..1F37C, 1F380..1F393, 1F3A0..1F3C4, 1F3C6..1F3CA, 1F3E0..1F3F0, 1F400..1F43E, 1F440, 1F442..1F4F7, 1F4F9..1F4FC, 1F500..1F53D, 1F550..1F567, 1F5FB..1F5FF	529	L2/09-027R2	N3681	Scherer, Markus (17 September 2009), Emoji Symbols: Background Data
6.0	U+1F300..1F320, 1F330..1F335, 1F337..1F37C, 1F380..1F393, 1F3A0..1F3C4, 1F3C6..1F3CA, 1F3E0..1F3F0, 1F400..1F43E, 1F440, 1F442..1F4F7, 1F4F9..1F4FC, 1F500..1F53D, 1F550..1F567, 1F5FB..1F5FF	529	L2/09-078	N3585	Scherer, Markus (6 February 2009), Emoji Sources
6.0	U+1F300..1F320, 1F330..1F335, 1F337..1F37C, 1F380..1F393, 1F3A0..1F3C4, 1F3C6..1F3CA, 1F3E0..1F3F0, 1F400..1F43E, 1F440, 1F442..1F4F7, 1F4F9..1F4FC, 1F500..1F53D, 1F550..1F567, 1F5FB..1F5FF	529	L2/09-003R		Moore, Lisa (12 February 2009), "D.2", UTC #118 / L2 #215 Minutes
6.0	U+1F300..1F320, 1F330..1F335, 1F337..1F37C, 1F380..1F393, 1F3A0..1F3C4, 1F3C6..1F3CA, 1F3E0..1F3F0, 1F400..1F43E, 1F440, 1F442..1F4F7, 1F4F9..1F4FC, 1F500..1F53D, 1F550..1F567, 1F5FB..1F5FF	529	L2/09-114	N3607	Towards an encoding of symbol characters used as emoji, 6 April 2009
6.0	U+1F300..1F320, 1F330..1F335, 1F337..1F37C, 1F380..1F393, 1F3A0..1F3C4, 1F3C6..1F3CA, 1F3E0..1F3F0, 1F400..1F43E, 1F440, 1F442..1F4F7, 1F4F9..1F4FC, 1F500..1F53D, 1F550..1F567, 1F5FB..1F5FF	529	L2/09-139	N3614 (Note: Japanese translation of N3614 is available as N3620)	Scherer, Markus; Davis, Mark; Momoi, Kat; Tong, Darick; Kida, Yasuo; Edberg, Peter (9 April 2009), Response to Concerns Raised in N3607 About Encoding Emoji Characters
6.0	U+1F300..1F320, 1F330..1F335, 1F337..1F37C, 1F380..1F393, 1F3A0..1F3C4, 1F3C6..1F3CA, 1F3E0..1F3F0, 1F400..1F43E, 1F440, 1F442..1F4F7, 1F4F9..1F4FC, 1F500..1F53D, 1F550..1F567, 1F5FB..1F5FF	529		N3619	Momoi, Kat (17 April 2009), Support Statements from KDDI/AU, SoftBank, and NTT docomo to Google/Apple Emoji Proposal
6.0	U+1F300..1F320, 1F330..1F335, 1F337..1F37C, 1F380..1F393, 1F3A0..1F3C4, 1F3C6..1F3CA, 1F3E0..1F3F0, 1F400..1F43E, 1F440, 1F442..1F4F7, 1F4F9..1F4FC, 1F500..1F53D, 1F550..1F567, 1F5FB..1F5FF	529	L2/09-153	N3636	Constable, Peter (22 April 2009), Emoji ad-hoc meeting report
6.0	U+1F300..1F320, 1F330..1F335, 1F337..1F37C, 1F380..1F393, 1F3A0..1F3C4, 1F3C6..1F3CA, 1F3E0..1F3F0, 1F400..1F43E, 1F440, 1F442..1F4F7, 1F4F9..1F4FC, 1F500..1F53D, 1F550..1F567, 1F5FB..1F5FF	529	L2/09-234	N3603 (pdf, doc)	Umamaheswaran, V. S. (8 July 2009), "M54.12", Unconfirmed minutes of WG 2 meeting 54
6.0	U+1F300..1F320, 1F330..1F335, 1F337..1F37C, 1F380..1F393, 1F3A0..1F3C4, 1F3C6..1F3CA, 1F3E0..1F3F0, 1F400..1F43E, 1F440, 1F442..1F4F7, 1F4F9..1F4FC, 1F500..1F53D, 1F550..1F567, 1F5FB..1F5FF	529	L2/09-104		Moore, Lisa (20 May 2009), "B.16.1", UTC #119 / L2 #216 Minutes
6.0	U+1F300..1F320, 1F330..1F335, 1F337..1F37C, 1F380..1F393, 1F3A0..1F3C4, 1F3C6..1F3CA, 1F3E0..1F3F0, 1F400..1F43E, 1F440, 1F442..1F4F7, 1F4F9..1F4FC, 1F500..1F53D, 1F550..1F567, 1F5FB..1F5FF	529	L2/09-272		Scherer, Markus; Davis, Mark; Momoi, Kat; Edberg, Peter (6 August 2009), Emoji: Review of PDAM 8
6.0	U+1F300..1F320, 1F330..1F335, 1F337..1F37C, 1F380..1F393, 1F3A0..1F3C4, 1F3C6..1F3CA, 1F3E0..1F3F0, 1F400..1F43E, 1F440, 1F442..1F4F7, 1F4F9..1F4FC, 1F500..1F53D, 1F550..1F567, 1F5FB..1F5FF	529	L2/09-304		Anderson, Deborah (15 August 2009), US Position on PDAM 8
6.0	U+1F300..1F320, 1F330..1F335, 1F337..1F37C, 1F380..1F393, 1F3A0..1F3C4, 1F3C6..1F3CA, 1F3E0..1F3F0, 1F400..1F43E, 1F440, 1F442..1F4F7, 1F4F9..1F4FC, 1F500..1F53D, 1F550..1F567, 1F5FB..1F5FF	529	L2/09-225R		Moore, Lisa (17 August 2009), "D.1", UTC #120 / L2 #217 Minutes
6.0	U+1F300..1F320, 1F330..1F335, 1F337..1F37C, 1F380..1F393, 1F3A0..1F3C4, 1F3C6..1F3CA, 1F3E0..1F3F0, 1F400..1F43E, 1F440, 1F442..1F4F7, 1F4F9..1F4FC, 1F500..1F53D, 1F550..1F567, 1F5FB..1F5FF	529	L2/09-323	N3687	Proposal to encode two additional Mailbox Symbols complementing the Emoji set, 21 September 2009
6.0	U+1F300..1F320, 1F330..1F335, 1F337..1F37C, 1F380..1F393, 1F3A0..1F3C4, 1F3C6..1F3CA, 1F3E0..1F3F0, 1F400..1F43E, 1F440, 1F442..1F4F7, 1F4F9..1F4FC, 1F500..1F53D, 1F550..1F567, 1F5FB..1F5FF	529		N3712	Scherer, Markus (21 October 2009), Emoji sources
6.0	U+1F300..1F320, 1F330..1F335, 1F337..1F37C, 1F380..1F393, 1F3A0..1F3C4, 1F3C6..1F3CA, 1F3E0..1F3F0, 1F400..1F43E, 1F440, 1F442..1F4F7, 1F4F9..1F4FC, 1F500..1F53D, 1F550..1F567, 1F5FB..1F5FF	529	L2/09-370	N3711	Ogata, Katsuhiro; et al. (22 October 2009), A Proposal to Revise a Part of Emoticons in PDAM 8
6.0	U+1F300..1F320, 1F330..1F335, 1F337..1F37C, 1F380..1F393, 1F3A0..1F3C4, 1F3C6..1F3CA, 1F3E0..1F3F0, 1F400..1F43E, 1F440, 1F442..1F4F7, 1F4F9..1F4FC, 1F500..1F53D, 1F550..1F567, 1F5FB..1F5FF	529	L2/09-412	N3722	Suignard, Michel (26 October 2009), Disposition of comments on SC2 N 4078 (PDAM text for Amendment 8 to ISO/IEC 10646:2003)
6.0	U+1F300..1F320, 1F330..1F335, 1F337..1F37C, 1F380..1F393, 1F3A0..1F3C4, 1F3C6..1F3CA, 1F3E0..1F3F0, 1F400..1F43E, 1F440, 1F442..1F4F7, 1F4F9..1F4FC, 1F500..1F53D, 1F550..1F567, 1F5FB..1F5FF	529	L2/10-025	N3726	Constable, Peter (27 October 2009), Emoji ad-hoc meeting report 2009-10-27
6.0	U+1F300..1F320, 1F330..1F335, 1F337..1F37C, 1F380..1F393, 1F3A0..1F3C4, 1F3C6..1F3CA, 1F3E0..1F3F0, 1F400..1F43E, 1F440, 1F442..1F4F7, 1F4F9..1F4FC, 1F500..1F53D, 1F550..1F567, 1F5FB..1F5FF	529		N3728	Scherer, Markus (28 October 2009), Emoji sources
6.0	U+1F300..1F320, 1F330..1F335, 1F337..1F37C, 1F380..1F393, 1F3A0..1F3C4, 1F3C6..1F3CA, 1F3E0..1F3F0, 1F400..1F43E, 1F440, 1F442..1F4F7, 1F4F9..1F4FC, 1F500..1F53D, 1F550..1F567, 1F5FB..1F5FF	529		N3703 (pdf, doc)	Umamaheswaran, V. S. (13 April 2010), "M55.5, M55.9e, M55.9f, M55.9i", Unconfirmed minutes of WG 2 meeting no. 55, Tokyo 2009-10-26/30
6.0	U+1F300..1F320, 1F330..1F335, 1F337..1F37C, 1F380..1F393, 1F3A0..1F3C4, 1F3C6..1F3CA, 1F3E0..1F3F0, 1F400..1F43E, 1F440, 1F442..1F4F7, 1F4F9..1F4FC, 1F500..1F53D, 1F550..1F567, 1F5FB..1F5FF	529	L2/09-335R		Moore, Lisa (10 November 2009), "Consensus 121-C8, 121-C9", UTC #121 / L2 #218 Minutes
6.0	U+1F300..1F320, 1F330..1F335, 1F337..1F37C, 1F380..1F393, 1F3A0..1F3C4, 1F3C6..1F3CA, 1F3E0..1F3F0, 1F400..1F43E, 1F440, 1F442..1F4F7, 1F4F9..1F4FC, 1F500..1F53D, 1F550..1F567, 1F5FB..1F5FF	529	L2/10-061R		Scherer, Markus; et al. (4 February 2010), Emoji: Review of FPDAM8
6.0	U+1F300..1F320, 1F330..1F335, 1F337..1F37C, 1F380..1F393, 1F3A0..1F3C4, 1F3C6..1F3CA, 1F3E0..1F3F0, 1F400..1F43E, 1F440, 1F442..1F4F7, 1F4F9..1F4FC, 1F500..1F53D, 1F550..1F567, 1F5FB..1F5FF	529	L2/10-015R		Moore, Lisa (9 February 2010), "D.1.4", UTC #122 / L2 #219 Minutes
6.0	U+1F300..1F320, 1F330..1F335, 1F337..1F37C, 1F380..1F393, 1F3A0..1F3C4, 1F3C6..1F3CA, 1F3E0..1F3F0, 1F400..1F43E, 1F440, 1F442..1F4F7, 1F4F9..1F4FC, 1F500..1F53D, 1F550..1F567, 1F5FB..1F5FF	529	L2/10-088	N3776	DoCoMo Input on Emoji, 8 March 2010
6.0	U+1F300..1F320, 1F330..1F335, 1F337..1F37C, 1F380..1F393, 1F3A0..1F3C4, 1F3C6..1F3CA, 1F3E0..1F3F0, 1F400..1F43E, 1F440, 1F442..1F4F7, 1F4F9..1F4FC, 1F500..1F53D, 1F550..1F567, 1F5FB..1F5FF	529	L2/10-089	N3777	KDDI Input on Emoji, 8 March 2010
6.0	U+1F300..1F320, 1F330..1F335, 1F337..1F37C, 1F380..1F393, 1F3A0..1F3C4, 1F3C6..1F3CA, 1F3E0..1F3F0, 1F400..1F43E, 1F440, 1F442..1F4F7, 1F4F9..1F4FC, 1F500..1F53D, 1F550..1F567, 1F5FB..1F5FF	529	L2/10-090	N3783	Willcom Input on Emoji, 8 March 2010
6.0	U+1F300..1F320, 1F330..1F335, 1F337..1F37C, 1F380..1F393, 1F3A0..1F3C4, 1F3C6..1F3CA, 1F3E0..1F3F0, 1F400..1F43E, 1F440, 1F442..1F4F7, 1F4F9..1F4FC, 1F500..1F53D, 1F550..1F567, 1F5FB..1F5FF	529	L2/10-126	N3785	Pentzlin, Karl (16 April 2010), Problems concerning "U+1F471 WESTERN PERSON" in ISO-IEC 10646 FPDAM8
6.0	U+1F300..1F320, 1F330..1F335, 1F337..1F37C, 1F380..1F393, 1F3A0..1F3C4, 1F3C6..1F3CA, 1F3E0..1F3F0, 1F400..1F43E, 1F440, 1F442..1F4F7, 1F4F9..1F4FC, 1F500..1F53D, 1F550..1F567, 1F5FB..1F5FF	529	L2/10-137	N3828	Suignard, Michel (22 April 2010), Disposition of comments on SC2 N 4123 (FPDAM text for Amendment 8 to ISO/IEC 10646:2003)
6.0	U+1F300..1F320, 1F330..1F335, 1F337..1F37C, 1F380..1F393, 1F3A0..1F3C4, 1F3C6..1F3CA, 1F3E0..1F3F0, 1F400..1F43E, 1F440, 1F442..1F4F7, 1F4F9..1F4FC, 1F500..1F53D, 1F550..1F567, 1F5FB..1F5FF	529	L2/10-150	N3835	Scherer, Markus (24 April 2010), Emoji Sources
6.0	U+1F300..1F320, 1F330..1F335, 1F337..1F37C, 1F380..1F393, 1F3A0..1F3C4, 1F3C6..1F3CA, 1F3E0..1F3F0, 1F400..1F43E, 1F440, 1F442..1F4F7, 1F4F9..1F4FC, 1F500..1F53D, 1F550..1F567, 1F5FB..1F5FF	529	L2/10-132		Scherer, Markus; Davis, Mark; Momoi, Kat; Tong, Darick; Kida, Yasuo; Edberg, Peter (27 April 2010), Emoji Symbols: Background Data
6.0	U+1F300..1F320, 1F330..1F335, 1F337..1F37C, 1F380..1F393, 1F3A0..1F3C4, 1F3C6..1F3CA, 1F3E0..1F3F0, 1F400..1F43E, 1F440, 1F442..1F4F7, 1F4F9..1F4FC, 1F500..1F53D, 1F550..1F567, 1F5FB..1F5FF	529	L2/10-138	N3829	Constable, Peter; et al. (27 April 2010), Emoji Ad-Hoc Meeting Report
6.0	U+1F300..1F320, 1F330..1F335, 1F337..1F37C, 1F380..1F393, 1F3A0..1F3C4, 1F3C6..1F3CA, 1F3E0..1F3F0, 1F400..1F43E, 1F440, 1F442..1F4F7, 1F4F9..1F4FC, 1F500..1F53D, 1F550..1F567, 1F5FB..1F5FF	529	L2/10-108		Moore, Lisa (19 May 2010), "Consensus 123-C2 [U+1F471, U+1F4A7]", UTC #123 / L2 #220 Minutes
6.0	U+1F300..1F320, 1F330..1F335, 1F337..1F37C, 1F380..1F393, 1F3A0..1F3C4, 1F3C6..1F3CA, 1F3E0..1F3F0, 1F400..1F43E, 1F440, 1F442..1F4F7, 1F4F9..1F4FC, 1F500..1F53D, 1F550..1F567, 1F5FB..1F5FF	529		N3803 (pdf, doc)	"M56.01", Unconfirmed minutes of WG 2 meeting no. 56, 24 September 2010
6.0	U+1F300..1F320, 1F330..1F335, 1F337..1F37C, 1F380..1F393, 1F3A0..1F3C4, 1F3C6..1F3CA, 1F3E0..1F3F0, 1F400..1F43E, 1F440, 1F442..1F4F7, 1F4F9..1F4FC, 1F500..1F53D, 1F550..1F567, 1F5FB..1F5FF	529	L2/11-415		Edberg, Peter (28 October 2011), Unified Emoji Reference
6.0	U+1F300..1F320, 1F330..1F335, 1F337..1F37C, 1F380..1F393, 1F3A0..1F3C4, 1F3C6..1F3CA, 1F3E0..1F3F0, 1F400..1F43E, 1F440, 1F442..1F4F7, 1F4F9..1F4FC, 1F500..1F53D, 1F550..1F567, 1F5FB..1F5FF	529	L2/12-198		Edberg, Peter (11 May 2012), Line break issues with characters used for emoji
6.0	U+1F300..1F320, 1F330..1F335, 1F337..1F37C, 1F380..1F393, 1F3A0..1F3C4, 1F3C6..1F3CA, 1F3E0..1F3F0, 1F400..1F43E, 1F440, 1F442..1F4F7, 1F4F9..1F4FC, 1F500..1F53D, 1F550..1F567, 1F5FB..1F5FF	529	L2/12-112		Moore, Lisa (17 May 2012), "B.14.10", UTC #131 / L2 #228 Minutes
6.0	U+1F300..1F320, 1F330..1F335, 1F337..1F37C, 1F380..1F393, 1F3A0..1F3C4, 1F3C6..1F3CA, 1F3E0..1F3F0, 1F400..1F43E, 1F440, 1F442..1F4F7, 1F4F9..1F4FC, 1F500..1F53D, 1F550..1F567, 1F5FB..1F5FF	529	L2/15-015R2		Davis, Mark; et al. (21 January 2015), Recommended Unicode Glyph / Nameslist changes
6.0	U+1F300..1F320, 1F330..1F335, 1F337..1F37C, 1F380..1F393, 1F3A0..1F3C4, 1F3C6..1F3CA, 1F3E0..1F3F0, 1F400..1F43E, 1F440, 1F442..1F4F7, 1F4F9..1F4FC, 1F500..1F53D, 1F550..1F567, 1F5FB..1F5FF	529	L2/15-057		Davis, Mark (1 February 2015), Emoji Press Page
6.0	U+1F300..1F320, 1F330..1F335, 1F337..1F37C, 1F380..1F393, 1F3A0..1F3C4, 1F3C6..1F3CA, 1F3E0..1F3F0, 1F400..1F43E, 1F440, 1F442..1F4F7, 1F4F9..1F4FC, 1F500..1F53D, 1F550..1F567, 1F5FB..1F5FF	529	L2/15-071R		Davis, Mark; Burge, Jeremy (3 February 2015), More Unicode Emoji Glyph changes
6.0	U+1F300..1F320, 1F330..1F335, 1F337..1F37C, 1F380..1F393, 1F3A0..1F3C4, 1F3C6..1F3CA, 1F3E0..1F3F0, 1F400..1F43E, 1F440, 1F442..1F4F7, 1F4F9..1F4FC, 1F500..1F53D, 1F550..1F567, 1F5FB..1F5FF	529	L2/15-141 (pdf, html)		Davis, Mark; Edberg, Peter (31 March 2015), Emoji Glyph and Annotation Recommendations
6.0	U+1F300..1F320, 1F330..1F335, 1F337..1F37C, 1F380..1F393, 1F3A0..1F3C4, 1F3C6..1F3CA, 1F3E0..1F3F0, 1F400..1F43E, 1F440, 1F442..1F4F7, 1F4F9..1F4FC, 1F500..1F53D, 1F550..1F567, 1F5FB..1F5FF	529	L2/15-107		Moore, Lisa (12 May 2015), "Consensus 143-C20", UTC #143 Minutes, "Update chart glyphs and annotations based on L2/15-151 for Unicode 8.0."
6.0	U+1F300..1F320, 1F330..1F335, 1F337..1F37C, 1F380..1F393, 1F3A0..1F3C4, 1F3C6..1F3CA, 1F3E0..1F3F0, 1F400..1F43E, 1F440, 1F442..1F4F7, 1F4F9..1F4FC, 1F500..1F53D, 1F550..1F567, 1F5FB..1F5FF	529	L2/15-199		Proposed annotation additions for Unicode 9.0, 31 July 2015
6.0	U+1F300..1F320, 1F330..1F335, 1F337..1F37C, 1F380..1F393, 1F3A0..1F3C4, 1F3C6..1F3CA, 1F3E0..1F3F0, 1F400..1F43E, 1F440, 1F442..1F4F7, 1F4F9..1F4FC, 1F500..1F53D, 1F550..1F567, 1F5FB..1F5FF	529	L2/15-322		Edberg, Peter; Davis, Mark (4 November 2015), Remove 2 characters from Emoji_Modifier_Base
6.0	U+1F300..1F320, 1F330..1F335, 1F337..1F37C, 1F380..1F393, 1F3A0..1F3C4, 1F3C6..1F3CA, 1F3E0..1F3F0, 1F400..1F43E, 1F440, 1F442..1F4F7, 1F4F9..1F4FC, 1F500..1F53D, 1F550..1F567, 1F5FB..1F5FF	529	L2/16-036		Davis, Mark (24 January 2016), Nameslist.txt suggestions
6.0	U+1F300..1F320, 1F330..1F335, 1F337..1F37C, 1F380..1F393, 1F3A0..1F3C4, 1F3C6..1F3CA, 1F3E0..1F3F0, 1F400..1F43E, 1F440, 1F442..1F4F7, 1F4F9..1F4FC, 1F500..1F53D, 1F550..1F567, 1F5FB..1F5FF	529	L2/16-183		Davis, Mark (19 July 2016), Rainbow Flag Emoji
6.0	U+1F300..1F320, 1F330..1F335, 1F337..1F37C, 1F380..1F393, 1F3A0..1F3C4, 1F3C6..1F3CA, 1F3E0..1F3F0, 1F400..1F43E, 1F440, 1F442..1F4F7, 1F4F9..1F4FC, 1F500..1F53D, 1F550..1F567, 1F5FB..1F5FF	529	L2/16-228		Constable, Peter; Safran-Aasen, Judy; Coady, Michele; Bjornstad, Shelley (4 August 2016), Proposed Additions to Emoji_Modifier_Base
6.0	U+1F300..1F320, 1F330..1F335, 1F337..1F37C, 1F380..1F393, 1F3A0..1F3C4, 1F3C6..1F3CA, 1F3E0..1F3F0, 1F400..1F43E, 1F440, 1F442..1F4F7, 1F4F9..1F4FC, 1F500..1F53D, 1F550..1F567, 1F5FB..1F5FF	529	L2/16-203		Moore, Lisa (18 August 2016), "B.12.1.3", UTC #148 Minutes
6.0	U+1F300..1F320, 1F330..1F335, 1F337..1F37C, 1F380..1F393, 1F3A0..1F3C4, 1F3C6..1F3CA, 1F3E0..1F3F0, 1F400..1F43E, 1F440, 1F442..1F4F7, 1F4F9..1F4FC, 1F500..1F53D, 1F550..1F567, 1F5FB..1F5FF	529	L2/16-281		Burge, Jeremy; Hunt, Paul (17 October 2016), Emoji Glyph Updates
6.0	U+1F300..1F320, 1F330..1F335, 1F337..1F37C, 1F380..1F393, 1F3A0..1F3C4, 1F3C6..1F3CA, 1F3E0..1F3F0, 1F400..1F43E, 1F440, 1F442..1F4F7, 1F4F9..1F4FC, 1F500..1F53D, 1F550..1F567, 1F5FB..1F5FF	529	L2/16-332		Edberg, Peter; et al. (4 November 2016), Remove multi-person emoji from Emoji_Modifier_Base
6.0	U+1F300..1F320, 1F330..1F335, 1F337..1F37C, 1F380..1F393, 1F3A0..1F3C4, 1F3C6..1F3CA, 1F3E0..1F3F0, 1F400..1F43E, 1F440, 1F442..1F4F7, 1F4F9..1F4FC, 1F500..1F53D, 1F550..1F567, 1F5FB..1F5FF	529	L2/16-361		Pournader, Roozbeh; Felt, Doug (7 November 2016), Add text and emoji standardized variation sequences for 96 symbols
6.0	U+1F300..1F320, 1F330..1F335, 1F337..1F37C, 1F380..1F393, 1F3A0..1F3C4, 1F3C6..1F3CA, 1F3E0..1F3F0, 1F400..1F43E, 1F440, 1F442..1F4F7, 1F4F9..1F4FC, 1F500..1F53D, 1F550..1F567, 1F5FB..1F5FF	529	L2/16-325		Moore, Lisa (18 November 2016), "Consensus 149-C13", UTC #149 Minutes, "Consensus: Remove the 7 characters documented in L2/16-332 from Emoji_Modifier_Base, for the beta version of Emoji 4.0, including a change of two characters from Emoji 3.0 (U+1F93C Wrestlers and U+1F91D Handshake)."
6.0	U+1F300..1F320, 1F330..1F335, 1F337..1F37C, 1F380..1F393, 1F3A0..1F3C4, 1F3C6..1F3CA, 1F3E0..1F3F0, 1F400..1F43E, 1F440, 1F442..1F4F7, 1F4F9..1F4FC, 1F500..1F53D, 1F550..1F567, 1F5FB..1F5FF	529	L2/17-071		Davis, Mark (14 March 2017), Gender-Neutral Human-form Emoji
6.0	U+1F300..1F320, 1F330..1F335, 1F337..1F37C, 1F380..1F393, 1F3A0..1F3C4, 1F3C6..1F3CA, 1F3E0..1F3F0, 1F400..1F43E, 1F440, 1F442..1F4F7, 1F4F9..1F4FC, 1F500..1F53D, 1F550..1F567, 1F5FB..1F5FF	529	L2/17-161	N4794	Suignard, Michel (8 May 2017), "Ireland E4 (1F308 RAINBOW), T5 (1F3B1 BILLIARDS), E5 (1F409 DRAGON), E6 (1F40B WHALE), E7 (1F450 OPEN HANDS SIGN), E8 (1F47B GHOST), E9 (1F4A9 PILE OF POO), E10 (1F4AA FLEXED BICEPS); UK T8 (1F3B1 BILLIARDS)", Draft disposition of comments on PDAM1.2 to ISO/IEC 10646 5th edition
6.0	U+1F300..1F320, 1F330..1F335, 1F337..1F37C, 1F380..1F393, 1F3A0..1F3C4, 1F3C6..1F3CA, 1F3E0..1F3F0, 1F400..1F43E, 1F440, 1F442..1F4F7, 1F4F9..1F4FC, 1F500..1F53D, 1F550..1F567, 1F5FB..1F5FF	529	L2/17-232		Buff, Charlotte (28 June 2017), Proposal for Fully Gender-Inclusive Emoji
6.0	U+1F300..1F320, 1F330..1F335, 1F337..1F37C, 1F380..1F393, 1F3A0..1F3C4, 1F3C6..1F3CA, 1F3E0..1F3F0, 1F400..1F43E, 1F440, 1F442..1F4F7, 1F4F9..1F4FC, 1F500..1F53D, 1F550..1F567, 1F5FB..1F5FF	529	L2/17-287		Davis, Mark; Edberg, Peter (8 August 2017), "Gender Sign Sequences", Recommendations from ESC for 2018, part 2
6.0	U+1F300..1F320, 1F330..1F335, 1F337..1F37C, 1F380..1F393, 1F3A0..1F3C4, 1F3C6..1F3CA, 1F3E0..1F3F0, 1F400..1F43E, 1F440, 1F442..1F4F7, 1F4F9..1F4FC, 1F500..1F53D, 1F550..1F567, 1F5FB..1F5FF	529	L2/18-007		Moore, Lisa (19 March 2018), "Consensus 154-C7", UTC #154 Minutes, "Change the glyph for U+1F3B1 BILLIARDS to show a cue and a ball."
6.0	U+1F300..1F320, 1F330..1F335, 1F337..1F37C, 1F380..1F393, 1F3A0..1F3C4, 1F3C6..1F3CA, 1F3E0..1F3F0, 1F400..1F43E, 1F440, 1F442..1F4F7, 1F4F9..1F4FC, 1F500..1F53D, 1F550..1F567, 1F5FB..1F5FF	529	L2/18-228		Lee, Jennifer 8.; et al. (17 July 2018), Proposal for Inter-Skintone Couple Emoji Sequences
6.0	U+1F300..1F320, 1F330..1F335, 1F337..1F37C, 1F380..1F393, 1F3A0..1F3C4, 1F3C6..1F3CA, 1F3E0..1F3F0, 1F400..1F43E, 1F440, 1F442..1F4F7, 1F4F9..1F4FC, 1F500..1F53D, 1F550..1F567, 1F5FB..1F5FF	529	L2/18-222R3		"2. Recommendations for Emoji 12.0 (2019)", ESC Recommendations for 2018Q3 UTC, 25 July 2018
6.0	U+1F300..1F320, 1F330..1F335, 1F337..1F37C, 1F380..1F393, 1F3A0..1F3C4, 1F3C6..1F3CA, 1F3E0..1F3F0, 1F400..1F43E, 1F440, 1F442..1F4F7, 1F4F9..1F4FC, 1F500..1F53D, 1F550..1F567, 1F5FB..1F5FF	529	L2/18-183		Moore, Lisa (20 November 2018), "E.1.4.2.2 Proposal for Inter-Skintone Couple Emoji Sequences", UTC #156 Minutes
6.0	U+1F300..1F320, 1F330..1F335, 1F337..1F37C, 1F380..1F393, 1F3A0..1F3C4, 1F3C6..1F3CA, 1F3E0..1F3F0, 1F400..1F43E, 1F440, 1F442..1F4F7, 1F4F9..1F4FC, 1F500..1F53D, 1F550..1F567, 1F5FB..1F5FF	529	L2/19-296R		Sunne, Samantha; Riedel, Frederik (25 July 2019), Proposal for Emoji: POLAR BEAR
6.0	U+1F300..1F320, 1F330..1F335, 1F337..1F37C, 1F380..1F393, 1F3A0..1F3C4, 1F3C6..1F3CA, 1F3E0..1F3F0, 1F400..1F43E, 1F440, 1F442..1F4F7, 1F4F9..1F4FC, 1F500..1F53D, 1F550..1F567, 1F5FB..1F5FF	529	L2/19-307		Stinehour, Jenny (6 May 2019), Proposal for Emoji: CROW; RAVEN [Affects U+1F426]
6.0	U+1F300..1F320, 1F330..1F335, 1F337..1F37C, 1F380..1F393, 1F3A0..1F3C4, 1F3C6..1F3CA, 1F3E0..1F3F0, 1F400..1F43E, 1F440, 1F442..1F4F7, 1F4F9..1F4FC, 1F500..1F53D, 1F550..1F567, 1F5FB..1F5FF	529	L2/19-275R2		Edberg, Peter; Holbrook, Ned (27 August 2019), Alternate ZWJ sequences for women/men holding hands
6.0	U+1F300..1F320, 1F330..1F335, 1F337..1F37C, 1F380..1F393, 1F3A0..1F3C4, 1F3C6..1F3CA, 1F3E0..1F3F0, 1F400..1F43E, 1F440, 1F442..1F4F7, 1F4F9..1F4FC, 1F500..1F53D, 1F550..1F567, 1F5FB..1F5FF	529	L2/19-277R		Sunne, Samantha (17 July 2019), Proposal for Emoji: BLACK CAT
6.0	U+1F300..1F320, 1F330..1F335, 1F337..1F37C, 1F380..1F393, 1F3A0..1F3C4, 1F3C6..1F3CA, 1F3E0..1F3F0, 1F400..1F43E, 1F440, 1F442..1F4F7, 1F4F9..1F4FC, 1F500..1F53D, 1F550..1F567, 1F5FB..1F5FF	529	L2/19-231R		Daniel, Jennifer (23 July 2019), Recommendations for Gendered Emoji ZWJ Sequences for Unicode 13.0, Phase 2
6.0	U+1F300..1F320, 1F330..1F335, 1F337..1F37C, 1F380..1F393, 1F3A0..1F3C4, 1F3C6..1F3CA, 1F3E0..1F3F0, 1F400..1F43E, 1F440, 1F442..1F4F7, 1F4F9..1F4FC, 1F500..1F53D, 1F550..1F567, 1F5FB..1F5FF	529	L2/19-292R4		Davis, Mark (25 July 2019), "3. Proposals that depend on color mechanism", ESC Recommendations for 2019Q3 UTC
6.0	U+1F300..1F320, 1F330..1F335, 1F337..1F37C, 1F380..1F393, 1F3A0..1F3C4, 1F3C6..1F3CA, 1F3E0..1F3F0, 1F400..1F43E, 1F440, 1F442..1F4F7, 1F4F9..1F4FC, 1F500..1F53D, 1F550..1F567, 1F5FB..1F5FF	529	L2/19-270		Moore, Lisa (7 October 2019), "E.1.1.1, E.1.2, and E.1.3.5", UTC #160 Minutes
6.0	U+1F300..1F320, 1F330..1F335, 1F337..1F37C, 1F380..1F393, 1F3A0..1F3C4, 1F3C6..1F3CA, 1F3E0..1F3F0, 1F400..1F43E, 1F440, 1F442..1F4F7, 1F4F9..1F4FC, 1F500..1F53D, 1F550..1F567, 1F5FB..1F5FF	529	L2/19-377R		Daniel, Jennifer (14 January 2020), Multi-skintone Couples with Heart and Couples Kissing, Emoji ZWJ Sequences for Unicode 14.0 [Affects U+1F468, 1F469, 1F48B, 1F48F, and 1F491]
6.0	U+1F300..1F320, 1F330..1F335, 1F337..1F37C, 1F380..1F393, 1F3A0..1F3C4, 1F3C6..1F3CA, 1F3E0..1F3F0, 1F400..1F43E, 1F440, 1F442..1F4F7, 1F4F9..1F4FC, 1F500..1F53D, 1F550..1F567, 1F5FB..1F5FF	529	L2/20-015R		Moore, Lisa (14 May 2020), "Consensus 162-C8", Draft Minutes of UTC Meeting 162, "Accept 200 provisional emoji candidates"
6.0	U+1F300..1F320, 1F330..1F335, 1F337..1F37C, 1F380..1F393, 1F3A0..1F3C4, 1F3C6..1F3CA, 1F3E0..1F3F0, 1F400..1F43E, 1F440, 1F442..1F4F7, 1F4F9..1F4FC, 1F500..1F53D, 1F550..1F567, 1F5FB..1F5FF	529	L2/23-031		Antonio, Nicholas; Antonio, Tanita (17 August 2021), Proposal for Emoji: Lime [Affects U+1F34B]
6.0	U+1F300..1F320, 1F330..1F335, 1F337..1F37C, 1F380..1F393, 1F3A0..1F3C4, 1F3C6..1F3CA, 1F3E0..1F3F0, 1F400..1F43E, 1F440, 1F442..1F4F7, 1F4F9..1F4FC, 1F500..1F53D, 1F550..1F567, 1F5FB..1F5FF	529	L2/21-172R		Daniel, Jennifer (6 October 2021), Emoji Subcommittee Report Q4, 2021 [Affects U+1F426]
6.0	U+1F300..1F320, 1F330..1F335, 1F337..1F37C, 1F380..1F393, 1F3A0..1F3C4, 1F3C6..1F3CA, 1F3E0..1F3F0, 1F400..1F43E, 1F440, 1F442..1F4F7, 1F4F9..1F4FC, 1F500..1F53D, 1F550..1F567, 1F5FB..1F5FF	529	L2/22-016		Constable, Peter (21 April 2022), "Consensus 170-C21", UTC #170 Minutes, "Accept the change for provisional emoji candidate ... BLACK BIRD to be represented as a ZWJ sequence, U+1F426, U+200D, U+2B1B rather than as an atomic character"
6.0	U+1F300..1F320, 1F330..1F335, 1F337..1F37C, 1F380..1F393, 1F3A0..1F3C4, 1F3C6..1F3CA, 1F3E0..1F3F0, 1F400..1F43E, 1F440, 1F442..1F4F7, 1F4F9..1F4FC, 1F500..1F53D, 1F550..1F567, 1F5FB..1F5FF	529	L2/22-061		Constable, Peter (27 July 2022), "Consensus 171-C26 [Affects U+1F426]", Approved Minutes of UTC Meeting 171, "Approve the 20 emoji draft candidates for encoding, along with 10 skintone variants and one ZWJ sequence"
6.0	U+1F300..1F320, 1F330..1F335, 1F337..1F37C, 1F380..1F393, 1F3A0..1F3C4, 1F3C6..1F3CA, 1F3E0..1F3F0, 1F400..1F43E, 1F440, 1F442..1F4F7, 1F4F9..1F4FC, 1F500..1F53D, 1F550..1F567, 1F5FB..1F5FF	529	L2/22-275		Stewart, Sean; Daniel, Jennifer (19 October 2022), Exploring Emoji Directionality [Affects U+1F3C3, 1F468, and 1F469]
6.0	U+1F300..1F320, 1F330..1F335, 1F337..1F37C, 1F380..1F393, 1F3A0..1F3C4, 1F3C6..1F3CA, 1F3E0..1F3F0, 1F400..1F43E, 1F440, 1F442..1F4F7, 1F4F9..1F4FC, 1F500..1F53D, 1F550..1F567, 1F5FB..1F5FF	529	L2/22-246		Daniel, Jennifer (31 October 2022), "3. Exploring Emoji Directionality [Affects U+1F3C3, 1F468, and 1F469]", Emoji Subcommittee Report for UTC #173 (2022Q4)
6.0	U+1F300..1F320, 1F330..1F335, 1F337..1F37C, 1F380..1F393, 1F3A0..1F3C4, 1F3C6..1F3CA, 1F3E0..1F3F0, 1F400..1F43E, 1F440, 1F442..1F4F7, 1F4F9..1F4FC, 1F500..1F53D, 1F550..1F567, 1F5FB..1F5FF	529	L2/23-032		Daniel, Jennifer (16 December 2022), Brown Mushroom Emoji Proposal [Affects U+1F344]
6.0	U+1F300..1F320, 1F330..1F335, 1F337..1F37C, 1F380..1F393, 1F3A0..1F3C4, 1F3C6..1F3CA, 1F3E0..1F3F0, 1F400..1F43E, 1F440, 1F442..1F4F7, 1F4F9..1F4FC, 1F500..1F53D, 1F550..1F567, 1F5FB..1F5FF	529	L2/23-033		Lee, Jennifer 8.; Sunne, Samantha (3 January 2023), Proposal for Emoji: PHOENIX BIRD [Affects U+1F426]
6.0	U+1F300..1F320, 1F330..1F335, 1F337..1F37C, 1F380..1F393, 1F3A0..1F3C4, 1F3C6..1F3CA, 1F3E0..1F3F0, 1F400..1F43E, 1F440, 1F442..1F4F7, 1F4F9..1F4FC, 1F500..1F53D, 1F550..1F567, 1F5FB..1F5FF	529	L2/23-030R		Stewart, Sean (25 January 2023), Emoji Directionality Recommendation [Affects U+1F3C3, 1F468, and 1F469]
6.0	U+1F300..1F320, 1F330..1F335, 1F337..1F37C, 1F380..1F393, 1F3A0..1F3C4, 1F3C6..1F3CA, 1F3E0..1F3F0, 1F400..1F43E, 1F440, 1F442..1F4F7, 1F4F9..1F4FC, 1F500..1F53D, 1F550..1F567, 1F5FB..1F5FF	529	L2/23-037R		Daniel, Jennifer (25 January 2023), Recommendations for ZWJ Sequences, Unicode 15.1 [Affects U+1F344, 1F34B, 1F3C3, 1F426, 1F468, and 1F469]
6.0	U+1F300..1F320, 1F330..1F335, 1F337..1F37C, 1F380..1F393, 1F3A0..1F3C4, 1F3C6..1F3CA, 1F3E0..1F3F0, 1F400..1F43E, 1F440, 1F442..1F4F7, 1F4F9..1F4FC, 1F500..1F53D, 1F550..1F567, 1F5FB..1F5FF	529	L2/23-005		Constable, Peter (1 February 2023), "G.1.1 Emoji 15.1 Recommendations", UTC #174 Minutes
6.0	U+1F300..1F320, 1F330..1F335, 1F337..1F37C, 1F380..1F393, 1F3A0..1F3C4, 1F3C6..1F3CA, 1F3E0..1F3F0, 1F400..1F43E, 1F440, 1F442..1F4F7, 1F4F9..1F4FC, 1F500..1F53D, 1F550..1F567, 1F5FB..1F5FF	529	L2/24-252		Daniel, Jennifer (20 September 2024), Toned Multi-Person Emoji ZWJ Sequences [Affects U+1F430]
6.0	U+1F300..1F320, 1F330..1F335, 1F337..1F37C, 1F380..1F393, 1F3A0..1F3C4, 1F3C6..1F3CA, 1F3E0..1F3F0, 1F400..1F43E, 1F440, 1F442..1F4F7, 1F4F9..1F4FC, 1F500..1F53D, 1F550..1F567, 1F5FB..1F5FF	529	L2/24-226R		Daniel, Jennifer (6 November 2024), Emoji Standard & Research Working Group Report for UTC #181 (2024Q4) [Affects U+1F430]
6.0	U+1F300..1F320, 1F330..1F335, 1F337..1F37C, 1F380..1F393, 1F3A0..1F3C4, 1F3C6..1F3CA, 1F3E0..1F3F0, 1F400..1F43E, 1F440, 1F442..1F4F7, 1F4F9..1F4FC, 1F500..1F53D, 1F550..1F567, 1F5FB..1F5FF	529	L2/24-221		Constable, Peter (12 November 2024), "Consensus 181-C6 [Affects U+1F430]", UTC #181 Minutes, "Accept 150 new RGI emoji ZWJ sequences"
6.1	U+1F540..1F543	4	L2/09-310R	N3772	Shardt, Yuri; Andreev, Aleksandr (18 August 2009), Proposal to Encode the Typikon Symbols in Unicode
6.1	U+1F540..1F543	4	L2/10-015R		Moore, Lisa (9 February 2010), "C.6", UTC #122 / L2 #219 Minutes
6.1	U+1F540..1F543	4	L2/10-108		Moore, Lisa (19 May 2010), "Consensus 123-C5", UTC #123 / L2 #220 Minutes, "Accept the revised names, code points, and glyph changes for the four Typikon symbols..."
6.1	U+1F540..1F543	4	L2/10-305	N3884	Anderson, Deborah (6 August 2010), Spelling of CROSS POMMY in 1F540, 1F541, 1F542
6.1	U+1F540..1F543	4	L2/10-221		Moore, Lisa (23 August 2010), "C.29", UTC #124 / L2 #221 Minutes
6.1	U+1F540..1F543	4		N3803 (pdf, doc)	"M56.08f", Unconfirmed minutes of WG 2 meeting no. 56, 24 September 2010
6.1	U+1F540..1F543	4		N3903 (pdf, doc)	"M57.05 (Miscellaneous name changes)", Unconfirmed minutes of WG2 meeting 57, 31 March 2011
7.0	U+1F321..1F32C, 1F336, 1F37D, 1F394..1F39F, 1F3C5, 1F3CB..1F3CE, 1F3D4..1F3DF, 1F3F1..1F3F7, 1F43F, 1F441, 1F4F8, 1F4FD..1F4FE, 1F53E..1F53F, 1F546..1F54A, 1F568..1F579, 1F57B..1F5A3, 1F5A5..1F5FA	207	L2/11-052R		Suignard, Michel (15 February 2011), Wingdings and Webdings symbols - Preliminary study
7.0	U+1F321..1F32C, 1F336, 1F37D, 1F394..1F39F, 1F3C5, 1F3CB..1F3CE, 1F3D4..1F3DF, 1F3F1..1F3F7, 1F43F, 1F441, 1F4F8, 1F4FD..1F4FE, 1F53E..1F53F, 1F546..1F54A, 1F568..1F579, 1F57B..1F5A3, 1F5A5..1F5FA	207	L2/11-149		Suignard, Michel (9 May 2011), Proposal to add Wingdings and Webdings symbols
7.0	U+1F321..1F32C, 1F336, 1F37D, 1F394..1F39F, 1F3C5, 1F3CB..1F3CE, 1F3D4..1F3DF, 1F3F1..1F3F7, 1F43F, 1F441, 1F4F8, 1F4FD..1F4FE, 1F53E..1F53F, 1F546..1F54A, 1F568..1F579, 1F57B..1F5A3, 1F5A5..1F5FA	207	L2/11-196	N4022	Suignard, Michel (21 May 2011), Revised Wingdings proposal
7.0	U+1F321..1F32C, 1F336, 1F37D, 1F394..1F39F, 1F3C5, 1F3CB..1F3CE, 1F3D4..1F3DF, 1F3F1..1F3F7, 1F43F, 1F441, 1F4F8, 1F4FD..1F4FE, 1F53E..1F53F, 1F546..1F54A, 1F568..1F579, 1F57B..1F5A3, 1F5A5..1F5FA	207	L2/11-247	N4115	Suignard, Michel (8 June 2011), Proposal to add Wingdings and Webdings Symbols
7.0	U+1F321..1F32C, 1F336, 1F37D, 1F394..1F39F, 1F3C5, 1F3CB..1F3CE, 1F3D4..1F3DF, 1F3F1..1F3F7, 1F43F, 1F441, 1F4F8, 1F4FD..1F4FE, 1F53E..1F53F, 1F546..1F54A, 1F568..1F579, 1F57B..1F5A3, 1F5A5..1F5FA	207	L2/11-344	N4143	Suignard, Michel (28 September 2011), Updated proposal to add Wingdings and Webdings Symbols
7.0	U+1F321..1F32C, 1F336, 1F37D, 1F394..1F39F, 1F3C5, 1F3CB..1F3CE, 1F3D4..1F3DF, 1F3F1..1F3F7, 1F43F, 1F441, 1F4F8, 1F4FD..1F4FE, 1F53E..1F53F, 1F546..1F54A, 1F568..1F579, 1F57B..1F5A3, 1F5A5..1F5FA	207		N4103	"10.2.1 Wingdings/Webdings additions", Unconfirmed minutes of WG 2 meeting 58, 3 January 2012
7.0	U+1F321..1F32C, 1F336, 1F37D, 1F394..1F39F, 1F3C5, 1F3CB..1F3CE, 1F3D4..1F3DF, 1F3F1..1F3F7, 1F43F, 1F441, 1F4F8, 1F4FD..1F4FE, 1F53E..1F53F, 1F546..1F54A, 1F568..1F579, 1F57B..1F5A3, 1F5A5..1F5FA	207	L2/12-130	N4239	Suignard, Michel (8 May 2012), Disposition of comments on SC2 N 4201 (PDAM text for Amendment 1.2 to ISO/IEC 10646 3rd edition)
7.0	U+1F321..1F32C, 1F336, 1F37D, 1F394..1F39F, 1F3C5, 1F3CB..1F3CE, 1F3D4..1F3DF, 1F3F1..1F3F7, 1F43F, 1F441, 1F4F8, 1F4FD..1F4FE, 1F53E..1F53F, 1F546..1F54A, 1F568..1F579, 1F57B..1F5A3, 1F5A5..1F5FA	207		N4306R	Suignard, Michel (9 October 2012), Disposition of comments on SC2 N 4228 (PDAM text for Amendment 2 to ISO/IEC 10646 3rd edition)
7.0	U+1F321..1F32C, 1F336, 1F37D, 1F394..1F39F, 1F3C5, 1F3CB..1F3CE, 1F3D4..1F3DF, 1F3F1..1F3F7, 1F43F, 1F441, 1F4F8, 1F4FD..1F4FE, 1F53E..1F53F, 1F546..1F54A, 1F568..1F579, 1F57B..1F5A3, 1F5A5..1F5FA	207		N4363	Suignard, Michel (13 October 2012), Status of encoding of Wingdings and Webdings Symbols
7.0	U+1F321..1F32C, 1F336, 1F37D, 1F394..1F39F, 1F3C5, 1F3CB..1F3CE, 1F3D4..1F3DF, 1F3F1..1F3F7, 1F43F, 1F441, 1F4F8, 1F4FD..1F4FE, 1F53E..1F53F, 1F546..1F54A, 1F568..1F579, 1F57B..1F5A3, 1F5A5..1F5FA	207	L2/12-368	N4384	Suignard, Michel (6 November 2012), Status of encoding of Wingdings and Webdings Symbols
7.0	U+1F321..1F32C, 1F336, 1F37D, 1F394..1F39F, 1F3C5, 1F3CB..1F3CE, 1F3D4..1F3DF, 1F3F1..1F3F7, 1F43F, 1F441, 1F4F8, 1F4FD..1F4FE, 1F53E..1F53F, 1F546..1F54A, 1F568..1F579, 1F57B..1F5A3, 1F5A5..1F5FA	207	L2/12-086	N4223	Requests regarding the Wingdings/Webdings characters in ISO/IEC 10646 PDAM 1.2, 27 December 2012
7.0	U+1F321..1F32C, 1F336, 1F37D, 1F394..1F39F, 1F3C5, 1F3CB..1F3CE, 1F3D4..1F3DF, 1F3F1..1F3F7, 1F43F, 1F441, 1F4F8, 1F4FD..1F4FE, 1F53E..1F53F, 1F546..1F54A, 1F568..1F579, 1F57B..1F5A3, 1F5A5..1F5FA	207		N4353 (pdf, doc)	"M60.05d, M60.05e, M60.05g", Unconfirmed minutes of WG 2 meeting 60, 23 May 2013
7.0	U+1F321..1F32C, 1F336, 1F37D, 1F394..1F39F, 1F3C5, 1F3CB..1F3CE, 1F3D4..1F3DF, 1F3F1..1F3F7, 1F43F, 1F441, 1F4F8, 1F4FD..1F4FE, 1F53E..1F53F, 1F546..1F54A, 1F568..1F579, 1F57B..1F5A3, 1F5A5..1F5FA	207	L2/15-050R (Note: See also L2/13-207, L2/14-054, L2/14-063, L2/15-051A, L2/15-051B)		Davis, Mark; et al. (29 January 2015), Additional variation selectors for emoji
7.0	U+1F321..1F32C, 1F336, 1F37D, 1F394..1F39F, 1F3C5, 1F3CB..1F3CE, 1F3D4..1F3DF, 1F3F1..1F3F7, 1F43F, 1F441, 1F4F8, 1F4FD..1F4FE, 1F53E..1F53F, 1F546..1F54A, 1F568..1F579, 1F57B..1F5A3, 1F5A5..1F5FA	207	L2/15-141 (pdf, html)		Davis, Mark; Edberg, Peter (31 March 2015), Emoji Glyph and Annotation Recommendations
7.0	U+1F321..1F32C, 1F336, 1F37D, 1F394..1F39F, 1F3C5, 1F3CB..1F3CE, 1F3D4..1F3DF, 1F3F1..1F3F7, 1F43F, 1F441, 1F4F8, 1F4FD..1F4FE, 1F53E..1F53F, 1F546..1F54A, 1F568..1F579, 1F57B..1F5A3, 1F5A5..1F5FA	207	L2/15-201		Allow emoji modifiers for 2 existing and 1 proposed characters, 31 July 2015
7.0	U+1F321..1F32C, 1F336, 1F37D, 1F394..1F39F, 1F3C5, 1F3CB..1F3CE, 1F3D4..1F3DF, 1F3F1..1F3F7, 1F43F, 1F441, 1F4F8, 1F4FD..1F4FE, 1F53E..1F53F, 1F546..1F54A, 1F568..1F579, 1F57B..1F5A3, 1F5A5..1F5FA	207	L2/15-187		Moore, Lisa (11 August 2015), "Consensus 144-C17", UTC #144 Minutes, "Give emoji modifier status secondary to U+26F9 PERSON WITH BALL and U+1F3CB WEIGHT LIFTER, for the next revision of UTR #51."
7.0	U+1F321..1F32C, 1F336, 1F37D, 1F394..1F39F, 1F3C5, 1F3CB..1F3CE, 1F3D4..1F3DF, 1F3F1..1F3F7, 1F43F, 1F441, 1F4F8, 1F4FD..1F4FE, 1F53E..1F53F, 1F546..1F54A, 1F568..1F579, 1F57B..1F5A3, 1F5A5..1F5FA	207	L2/15-274		LEFT SPEECH BUBBLE as emoji; modifiers for SLEUTH..., 29 October 2015
7.0	U+1F321..1F32C, 1F336, 1F37D, 1F394..1F39F, 1F3C5, 1F3CB..1F3CE, 1F3D4..1F3DF, 1F3F1..1F3F7, 1F43F, 1F441, 1F4F8, 1F4FD..1F4FE, 1F53E..1F53F, 1F546..1F54A, 1F568..1F579, 1F57B..1F5A3, 1F5A5..1F5FA	207	L2/15-301 (Note: See also L2/15-198 and L2/15-275)		Pournader, Roozbeh (1 November 2015), A proposal for 278 standardized variation sequences for emoji
7.0	U+1F321..1F32C, 1F336, 1F37D, 1F394..1F39F, 1F3C5, 1F3CB..1F3CE, 1F3D4..1F3DF, 1F3F1..1F3F7, 1F43F, 1F441, 1F4F8, 1F4FD..1F4FE, 1F53E..1F53F, 1F546..1F54A, 1F568..1F579, 1F57B..1F5A3, 1F5A5..1F5FA	207	L2/16-157		Davis, Mark (10 May 2016), VS in emoji sequences
7.0	U+1F321..1F32C, 1F336, 1F37D, 1F394..1F39F, 1F3C5, 1F3CB..1F3CE, 1F3D4..1F3DF, 1F3F1..1F3F7, 1F43F, 1F441, 1F4F8, 1F4FD..1F4FE, 1F53E..1F53F, 1F546..1F54A, 1F568..1F579, 1F57B..1F5A3, 1F5A5..1F5FA	207	L2/16-121		Moore, Lisa (20 May 2016), "Action item 147-A34; Consensus 147-C4", UTC #147 Minutes
7.0	U+1F321..1F32C, 1F336, 1F37D, 1F394..1F39F, 1F3C5, 1F3CB..1F3CE, 1F3D4..1F3DF, 1F3F1..1F3F7, 1F43F, 1F441, 1F4F8, 1F4FD..1F4FE, 1F53E..1F53F, 1F546..1F54A, 1F568..1F579, 1F57B..1F5A3, 1F5A5..1F5FA	207	L2/16-183		Davis, Mark (19 July 2016), Rainbow Flag Emoji
7.0	U+1F321..1F32C, 1F336, 1F37D, 1F394..1F39F, 1F3C5, 1F3CB..1F3CE, 1F3D4..1F3DF, 1F3F1..1F3F7, 1F43F, 1F441, 1F4F8, 1F4FD..1F4FE, 1F53E..1F53F, 1F546..1F54A, 1F568..1F579, 1F57B..1F5A3, 1F5A5..1F5FA	207	L2/16-228		Constable, Peter; Safran-Aasen, Judy; Coady, Michele; Bjornstad, Shelley (4 August 2016), Proposed Additions to Emoji_Modifier_Base
7.0	U+1F321..1F32C, 1F336, 1F37D, 1F394..1F39F, 1F3C5, 1F3CB..1F3CE, 1F3D4..1F3DF, 1F3F1..1F3F7, 1F43F, 1F441, 1F4F8, 1F4FD..1F4FE, 1F53E..1F53F, 1F546..1F54A, 1F568..1F579, 1F57B..1F5A3, 1F5A5..1F5FA	207	L2/16-203		Moore, Lisa (18 August 2016), "B.12.1.3", UTC #148 Minutes
7.0	U+1F321..1F32C, 1F336, 1F37D, 1F394..1F39F, 1F3C5, 1F3CB..1F3CE, 1F3D4..1F3DF, 1F3F1..1F3F7, 1F43F, 1F441, 1F4F8, 1F4FD..1F4FE, 1F53E..1F53F, 1F546..1F54A, 1F568..1F579, 1F57B..1F5A3, 1F5A5..1F5FA	207	L2/17-071		Davis, Mark (14 March 2017), Gender-Neutral Human-form Emoji
7.0	U+1F321..1F32C, 1F336, 1F37D, 1F394..1F39F, 1F3C5, 1F3CB..1F3CE, 1F3D4..1F3DF, 1F3F1..1F3F7, 1F43F, 1F441, 1F4F8, 1F4FD..1F4FE, 1F53E..1F53F, 1F546..1F54A, 1F568..1F579, 1F57B..1F5A3, 1F5A5..1F5FA	207	L2/17-232		Buff, Charlotte (28 June 2017), Proposal for Fully Gender-Inclusive Emoji
7.0	U+1F321..1F32C, 1F336, 1F37D, 1F394..1F39F, 1F3C5, 1F3CB..1F3CE, 1F3D4..1F3DF, 1F3F1..1F3F7, 1F43F, 1F441, 1F4F8, 1F4FD..1F4FE, 1F53E..1F53F, 1F546..1F54A, 1F568..1F579, 1F57B..1F5A3, 1F5A5..1F5FA	207	L2/17-287		Davis, Mark; Edberg, Peter (8 August 2017), "Gender Sign Sequences", Recommendations from ESC for 2018, part 2
7.0	U+1F321..1F32C, 1F336, 1F37D, 1F394..1F39F, 1F3C5, 1F3CB..1F3CE, 1F3D4..1F3DF, 1F3F1..1F3F7, 1F43F, 1F441, 1F4F8, 1F4FD..1F4FE, 1F53E..1F53F, 1F546..1F54A, 1F568..1F579, 1F57B..1F5A3, 1F5A5..1F5FA	207	L2/18-007		Moore, Lisa (19 March 2018), "Action item 154-A12", UTC #154 Minutes, "Add an annotation to U+1F43F CHIPMUNK indicating that it is also used to represent squirrel, for Unicode 11.0."
7.0	U+1F321..1F32C, 1F336, 1F37D, 1F394..1F39F, 1F3C5, 1F3CB..1F3CE, 1F3D4..1F3DF, 1F3F1..1F3F7, 1F43F, 1F441, 1F4F8, 1F4FD..1F4FE, 1F53E..1F53F, 1F546..1F54A, 1F568..1F579, 1F57B..1F5A3, 1F5A5..1F5FA	207	L2/18-059		Burge, Jeremy; Haggerty, Bryan (2 February 2018), Proposal for new RGI Emoji Sequence, Pirate Flag Emoji
7.0	U+1F321..1F32C, 1F336, 1F37D, 1F394..1F39F, 1F3C5, 1F3CB..1F3CE, 1F3D4..1F3DF, 1F3F1..1F3F7, 1F43F, 1F441, 1F4F8, 1F4FD..1F4FE, 1F53E..1F53F, 1F546..1F54A, 1F568..1F579, 1F57B..1F5A3, 1F5A5..1F5FA	207	L2/19-080		Skarphéðinsdóttir, Alda Vigdís; Rey, Bianca; Simpson, Hannah; Uglow, Tea; Eytan, Ted; Cipiti, Chad; Helms, Monica (13 March 2019), Proposal for Transgender Flag Emoji
7.0	U+1F321..1F32C, 1F336, 1F37D, 1F394..1F39F, 1F3C5, 1F3CB..1F3CE, 1F3D4..1F3DF, 1F3F1..1F3F7, 1F43F, 1F441, 1F4F8, 1F4FD..1F4FE, 1F53E..1F53F, 1F546..1F54A, 1F568..1F579, 1F57B..1F5A3, 1F5A5..1F5FA	207	L2/19-231R		Daniel, Jennifer (23 July 2019), Recommendations for Gendered Emoji ZWJ Sequences for Unicode 13.0, Phase 2
7.0	U+1F321..1F32C, 1F336, 1F37D, 1F394..1F39F, 1F3C5, 1F3CB..1F3CE, 1F3D4..1F3DF, 1F3F1..1F3F7, 1F43F, 1F441, 1F4F8, 1F4FD..1F4FE, 1F53E..1F53F, 1F546..1F54A, 1F568..1F579, 1F57B..1F5A3, 1F5A5..1F5FA	207	L2/19-270		Moore, Lisa (7 October 2019), "E.1.1.1", UTC #160 Minutes
7.0	U+1F544	1	L2/10-416R		Moore, Lisa (9 November 2010), "C.25", UTC #125 / L2 #222 Minutes
7.0	U+1F544	1	L2/10-395R2	N3971	Shardt, Yuri; Simmons, Nikita; Andreev, Aleksandr (14 January 2011), Proposal to Encode the Typikon Symbols in Unicode: Part 2 Old Rite Symbols
7.0	U+1F544	1		N4103	"11.2.2 Typikon Symbols", Unconfirmed minutes of WG 2 meeting 58, 3 January 2012
7.0	U+1F545	1	L2/11-016		Moore, Lisa (15 February 2011), "C.3.2", UTC #126 / L2 #223 Minutes
7.0	U+1F545	1	L2/11-031	N3998	Andreev, Aleksandr; Shardt, Yuri; Simmons, Nikita (28 February 2011), Proposal to Encode the Mark's Chapter Glyph
7.0	U+1F545	1	L2/11-261R2		Moore, Lisa (16 August 2011), "Consensus 128-C30", UTC #128 / L2 #225 Minutes, "Approve the revised name U+1F545 SYMBOL FOR MARKS CHAPTER"
7.0	U+1F545	1		N4103	"11.2.3 Mark's Chapter Symbol", Unconfirmed minutes of WG 2 meeting 58, 3 January 2012
8.0	U+1F32D..1F32F, 1F37E..1F37F	5	L2/14-174R		Davis, Mark; Edberg, Peter (27 August 2014), Emoji Additions
8.0	U+1F32D..1F32F, 1F37E..1F37F	5	L2/14-172R		Davis, Mark; Edberg, Peter (29 August 2014), Proposed enhancements for emoji characters: background
8.0	U+1F32D..1F32F, 1F37E..1F37F	5	L2/14-275		Edberg, Peter; et al. (23 October 2014), Emoji ad-hoc committee recommendations to UTC #141
8.0	U+1F32D..1F32F, 1F37E..1F37F	5	L2/14-272R2		Edberg, Peter; Davis, Mark (28 October 2014), Emoji Additions: Popular requests
8.0	U+1F32D..1F32F, 1F37E..1F37F	5	L2/15-025	N4654	Anderson, Deborah (30 October 2014), Future Additions to ISO/IEC 10646
8.0	U+1F32D..1F32F, 1F37E..1F37F	5	L2/15-030		Davis, Mark (29 January 2015), Emojipedia top requests
8.0	U+1F3CF..1F3D3, 1F3F8	6	L2/14-273R (Note: See also L2/14-172R, L2/14-174R, L2/14-275, and L2/15-025)		Edberg, Peter; Davis, Mark (27 October 2014), Emoji Additions: Sports symbols
8.0	U+1F3CF..1F3D3, 1F3F8	6	L2/15-030		Davis, Mark (29 January 2015), Emojipedia top requests
8.0	U+1F3CF..1F3D3, 1F3F8	6	L2/15-017		Moore, Lisa (12 February 2015), "Consensus 142-C4", UTC #142 Minutes, "Change the name of U+1F3F8 from BADMINTON RACQUET AND BIRDIE to BADMINTON RACQUET AND SHUTTLECOCK."
8.0	U+1F3CF..1F3D3, 1F3F8	6	L2/15-032R		Davis, Mark (23 February 2015), Recommended Disposition on Feedback for PRI 286 & related Emoji docs
8.0	U+1F3F9..1F3FA	2	L2/14-284R2		Edberg, Peter; Davis, Mark (28 October 2014), Emoji-System Compatibility Additions
8.0	U+1F3F9..1F3FA	2	L2/15-199		Proposed annotation additions for Unicode 9.0, 31 July 2015
8.0	U+1F3FB..1F3FF	5	L2/14-173R		Edberg, Peter; Davis, Mark (5 August 2014), Variation selectors for Emoji skin tone
8.0	U+1F3FB..1F3FF	5	L2/14-204		Parrott, Katrina (7 August 2014), Suggested Skin Tone Variants
8.0	U+1F3FB..1F3FF	5	L2/14-172R		Davis, Mark; Edberg, Peter (29 August 2014), Proposed enhancements for emoji characters: background
8.0	U+1F3FB..1F3FF	5	L2/14-213	N4599	Edberg, Peter; et al. (11 September 2014), Skin tone modifier symbols
8.0	U+1F3FB..1F3FF	5	L2/14-227	N4646	Toshiya, Suzuki; Tashiro, Shuichi; Kobayashi, Tatsuo (1 October 2014), Proposal of Tone Modifier Symbols for Emoji
8.0	U+1F3FB..1F3FF	5	L2/14-226	N4644	Everson, Michael (2 October 2014), Proposal to encode Portrait Symbols in the SMP of the UCS
8.0	U+1F3FB..1F3FF	5	L2/14-177		Moore, Lisa (17 October 2014), "Emoji (E.1)", UTC #140 Minutes
8.0	U+1F3FB..1F3FF	5	L2/14-250		Moore, Lisa (10 November 2014), "Consensus 141-C5", UTC #141 Minutes
8.0	U+1F3FB..1F3FF	5	L2/15-032R		Davis, Mark (23 February 2015), Recommended Disposition on Feedback for PRI 286 & related Emoji docs
8.0	U+1F3FB..1F3FF	5	L2/16-052	N4603 (pdf, doc)	Umamaheswaran, V. S. (1 September 2015), "10.3.10.1, 10.3.10.2, 10.3.10.3", Unconfirmed minutes of WG 2 meeting 63
8.0	U+1F4FF, 1F54B..1F54E	5	L2/14-235R3		Afshar, Shervin; Pournader, Roozbeh (1 November 2014), Emoji and Symbol Additions - Religious Symbols and Structures
8.0	U+1F54F	1	L2/12-359	N4393	stas624-uni (2 November 2012), Proposal to encode BOWL OF HYGIEIA
8.0	U+1F54F	1	L2/13-028		Anderson, Deborah; McGowan, Rick; Whistler, Ken; Pournader, Roozbeh (28 January 2013), "13", Recommendations to UTC on Script Proposals
8.0	U+1F54F	1	L2/13-011		Moore, Lisa (4 February 2013), "Consensus 134-C3", UTC #134 Minutes, "Accept U+1F54F BOWL OF HYGIEIA for encoding in a future version of the standard."
8.0	U+1F54F	1		N4403 (pdf, doc)	Umamaheswaran, V. S. (28 January 2014), "10.3.5 Bowl of Hygieia", Unconfirmed minutes of WG 2 meeting 61, Holiday Inn, Vilnius, Lithuania; 2013-06-10/14
9.0	U+1F57A, 1F5A4	2	L2/15-030		Davis, Mark (29 January 2015), Emojipedia top requests
9.0	U+1F57A, 1F5A4	2	L2/15-048		Parrott, Katrina; et al. (31 January 2015), Adding gender counterparts to emoji list?
9.0	U+1F57A, 1F5A4	2	L2/15-061		Cummings, Craig (31 January 2015), Emoji Additions: Runner-ups
9.0	U+1F57A, 1F5A4	2	L2/15-054R5		Cummings, Craig (8 May 2015), Emoji Additions: Animals, Compatibility, and More Popular Requests
