= Optimality =

Optimality may refer to:

- Mathematical optimization
- Optimality theory in linguistics
- Optimality model, approach in biology

== See also ==
- Optimism (disambiguation)
- Optimist (disambiguation)
- Optimistic (disambiguation)
- Optimization (disambiguation)
- Optimum (disambiguation)
