= Optimization (disambiguation) =

Mathematical optimization is the theory and computation of extrema or stationary points of functions.

Optimization, optimisation, or optimality may also refer to:

- Engineering optimization
- Feedback-directed optimisation, in computing
- Optimality model in biology
- Optimality theory, in linguistics
- Optimization (role-playing games), a gaming play style
- Optimize (magazine)
- Process optimization, in business and engineering, methodologies for improving the efficiency of a production process
- Product optimization, in business and marketing, methodologies for improving the quality and desirability of a product or product concept
- Program optimization, in computing, methodologies for improving the efficiency of software
- Search engine optimization, in internet marketing
- Supply chain optimization, a methodology aiming to ensure the optimal operation of a manufacturing and distribution supply chain
- Social media optimization, in internet marketing, involves optimizing social media profiles

== Music ==
- Optimize (Coldrain EP)
- "Optimize" by Coldrain, from Optimize

== See also ==
- Optimum (disambiguation)
- Optimality theory (disambiguation)
- Optimism (disambiguation)
- Optimist (disambiguation)
- Optimistic (disambiguation)
- Maximization (disambiguation)
- Minimization (disambiguation)
