= Optimum (disambiguation) =

The optimum is the best or most favorable condition, or the greatest amount or degree possible under specific sets of comparable circumstances.

Optimum may also refer to:

- Optimum (brand), a digital cable and broadband service based in the US
- Optimum Releasing, a film and DVD distribution company based in the UK

== See also ==
- Optimal sorting (disambiguation)
- Optimality theory (disambiguation)
- Optimism (disambiguation)
- Optimist (disambiguation)
- Optimistic (disambiguation)
- Optimization (disambiguation), a concept in applied mathematics and engineering
- Optimum currency area, in economics and monetary policy
- Optimum programming, in computer programming
- Optimum sustainable yield, in population ecology and economics
- Thermal optimum, in geology and climate history
