= Minimal =

Minimal may refer to:

- Minimal element, a mathematical definition
- Minimal (music genre), art music that employs limited or minimal musical materials
- "Minimal" (song), 2006 song by Pet Shop Boys
- Minimal (supermarket) or miniMAL, a former supermarket chain in Germany and Poland
- Minimal (Dungeons & Dragons), a creature of magically reduced size in the game Dungeons & Dragons
- MINIMAL (restaurant), high end restaurant in Taichung, Taiwan

== See also ==
- Minimalism (disambiguation)
- Maximal (disambiguation)
- Minimisation (disambiguation)
- Minimal prime (disambiguation)
