= Shigetaka Kurita =

Japanese interface designer and inventor of the emoji

- Born: May 9, 1972 (age 54); Gifu Prefecture, Japan
- Known for: Emoji designer
- Notable work: NTT DoCoMo emoji set

Shigetaka Kurita (栗田 穣崇; born May 9, 1972, Gifu Prefecture, Japan) is a Japanese interface designer often cited for his early work with emoji sets. Many refer to him as the creator of the emoji, a claim that has been corrected and clarified in recent years. He was part of the team that created one of the first emojis used solely for communication, a heart-shaped pictogram that appeared on an NTT DoCoMo pager aimed at teenagers. It went on to become the Red Heart emoji.

This development and the aftermath of its use led Kurita to design a set of 176 colored emojis. Many of the general-use emojis used today by Unicode can be traced back to Kurita's set. He now works for Dwango Co. Ltd., a Japanese game company owned by Kadokawa Dwango Corporation.

The NTT DoCoMo emoji set he created is in the collection of the Museum of Modern Art (MoMA) in New York City.

== Creation of emoji sets ==
While emojis existed prior to the 1990s, they were often defined as pictograms in Asia. The term emoji is of Japanese origin, with the term only adopted in the west from 2010 onwards. Japan itself also struggled to define the emoji for a number of years. It wasn't until telecom companies began experimenting with the use of graphic images or pictograms in messaging facilities that the emoji concept became a working idea.

One of the first telecoms companies that trialed the concept of using pictograms in messaging facilities was NTT DoCoMo. In the 1990s, NTT DoCoMo released a pager that was aimed at teenagers. The pager was the first of its kind to include the option to send a pictogram as part of the text. The pager only had a single heart-shape pictogram as its option. This is thought to be Kurita's first exposure to the use of digital symbols in text form. The pager received rave reviews in Asia which led to other companies in the region to consider using pictograms in the list of text characters. NTT DoCoMo then released another pager aimed at businesspeople, but this time dropped the heart pictogram from the characters on the pager. Following its release, there was an outcry by users that the pictogram was no longer available and many customers switched to other providers that had now included a heart pictogram in their markup. This led NTT DoCoMo to reverse their decision and include the heart pictogram.

In interviews, Kurita said this experience left him and others at NTT DoCoMo knowing that symbols had to be part of future texting and communication services. For NTT DoCoMo's upcoming mobile system i-mode, it was decided that Kurita should design a set of pictograms, which could be used as characters on the new operating system.

== NTT DoCoMo emoji set ==
Kurita started designing an emoji set that could be used alongside the NTT DoCoMo heart emoji. He designed a set of 176 pictograms using a grid of 12x12 pixels that eventually started a global trend in the use of pictograms to communicate ideas through text messages. The set of pictograms became known as the first emoji set, as it is the first time the word had been recorded is thought to be used for pictograms. Emoji simply means "pictograph" or "icon" in Japanese.

To make the emoji set, Kurita got inspiration from Japanese manga where characters are often drawn with symbolic representations called manpu (such as a water drop on a face representing nervousness or confusion), as well as from weather pictograms, Chinese characters and street signs.

One of the most notable changes to other telecom companies that had started experimenting with emojis was the use and diversity of color in the set. Aside from basic numbers and shapes, the majority of the 176 emoji set contained color. The famous DTT DoCoMo heart remained as part of the set and was red. General-use emojis, such as sports, actions and weather, can easily be traced back to Kurita's emoji set. The yellow-faced emojis commonly used today evolved from other emoticon sets and cannot be traced back to Kurita's work.

In 2016, the original set of 176 emojis was added to the collection of the Museum of Modern Art (MoMA) and was exhibited in the exhibition Inbox: The Original Emoji, by Shigetaka Kurita. Kurita's designs are held in the collection of the M+ museum in Hong Kong, and were included in the 2018 exhibition Being Modern: MoMA in Paris at the Fondation Louis Vuitton.

In 2025, Kurita's original DoCoMo emojis were included in the MoMA's Pirouette: Turning Points in Design, an exhibition featuring "widely recognized design icons [...] highlighting pivotal moments in design history."
