= Erratum =

Correction of a published text

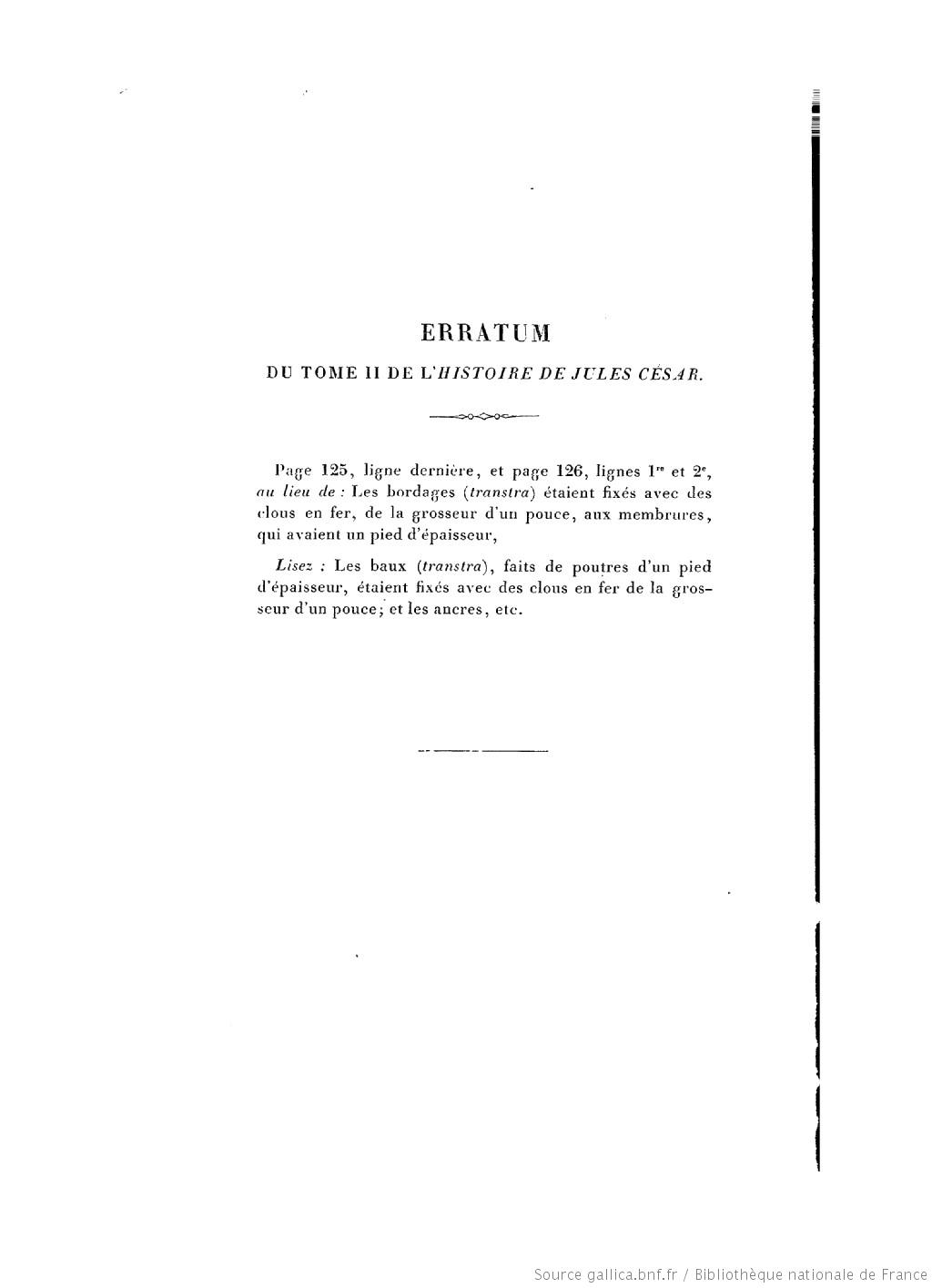
Jules César tome 2 – p. 585 – Erratum

An erratum or corrigendum (pl.: errata, corrigenda) (comes from Latin: errata corrige) is a correction of a published text. Generally, publishers issue an erratum for a production error (i.e., an error introduced during the publishing process) and a corrigendum for an author's error. It is usually bound into the back of a book, but for a single error a slip of paper detailing a corrigendum may be bound in before or after the page on which the error appears. An erratum may also be issued shortly after its original text is published.

== Etymology ==
Corrigendum is the gerundive form of the Latin compound verb corrigo -rexi -rectum (from the verb rego, "to make straight, rule", plus the preposition cum, "with"), "to correct", and thus signifies "(those things) which must be corrected" and in its single form Corrigendum it means "(that thing) which must be corrected".

== Errata sheets ==

According to the Chicago Manual of Style, "Errata, lists of errors and their corrections, may take the form of loose, inserted sheets or bound-in pages. An errata sheet is definitely not a usual part of a book. It should never be supplied to correct simple typographical errors (which may be rectified in a later printing) or to insert additions to, or revisions of, the printed text (which should wait for the next edition of the book). It is a device to be used only in extreme cases where errors severe enough to cause misunderstanding are detected too late to correct in the normal way but before the finished book is distributed. Then the errors may be listed with their locations and their corrections on a sheet that is tipped in, either before or after the book is bound, or laid in loose, usually inside the front cover of the book. (Tipping and inserting must be done by hand, thus adding considerably to the cost of the book.)"

== Errata associated with integrated circuits ==
Design errors and mistakes in a microprocessor's hardwired logic may also be documented and described as errata. One well-publicized example is Intel's "FDIV" erratum in early Pentium processors, known as the Pentium FDIV bug. This gave incorrect answers to a floating-point division instruction (FDIV) for a small set of numbers, due to an incorrect lookup table inside the Pentium chip.

Similarly, design errors in peripheral devices, such as disk controllers and video display units, can result in abnormal operation under certain conditions.

== Errata associated with trading card games ==
In trading card games, errata are official corrections or clarifications issued for cards whose printed text is incorrect or ambiguously worded. Errata may also be introduced to modify the functionality of a card that has been determined to be excessively powerful, in order to maintain game balance. This approach serves as an alternative to banning the card outright.

== See also ==
- Addendum
- Bible errata
- Cancel leaf
- Correction (newspaper)
- Expression of concern
- Retractions in academic publishing
