= Minification =

Minification may refer to:

- Magnification, by a factor of less than one, producing a smaller image
- Minification (programming), a software coding technique
- Minimisation (psychology), a form of cognitive distortion

== See also ==
- Minimization (disambiguation)
