= Cancel leaf =

Replaced book page

A cancel is a bibliographic term for a replaced leaf in a printed book. The technique for this is usually to tear out the rejected leaf and paste a new one to the stub left on the cognate leaf. Alternatively, a false stub (known as a "fold") may be added.

The cancelled leaf may be rejected on account of spelling or typing errors, a wording change or addition, or need to suppress libellous or otherwise offensive text.

Leaves have been cancelled from around the dawn of printing in the mid-15th century, peaked from about 1600 to 1800, but the practice is less common today, since it is now cheaper to replace the whole sheet.

If the replacement is made before publication, the book can exist in two states (i.e. with and without the new leaf). If after sale, from a new leaf supplied by the binder to the purchaser, it is termed an alternative issue.

Cancels are not always easy to detect, if the stub or fold they are attached to is small; however, often there will be a difference from other leaves in matters such as paper thickness, watermarks, chain-lines, etc. Whether the old leaf had a signature or not, the new one usually has one added. It occasionally occurs as an error that the old leaf is not excised, or even that the wrong leaf is removed. To obviate this, the old leaf is sometimes partly slit.

== Terminology ==
The terminology, coined by R. W. Chapman in 1930, is:

English: cancel (pl. cancels) or cancel leaf (pl. cancel leaves); Latin: cancellans (pl. cancellantia): The new, corrected leaf.

English: cancelland (pl. cancellands); Latin: cancellandum (pl. cancellanda): The leaf intended to be replaced or removed, when this has not yet been done.

English: cancelled leaf (pl. cancelled leaves); Latin: cancellatum (pl. cancellata): Refers to the cancellandum after it has been removed.

== See also ==
- Addendum
- Corrigendum
- Erratum
- Intentionally blank page
