= Even working =

Term used in book publishing

Even working is a term used in book publishing that means the number of pages in a book is divisible by the number 16 or 32. A book with 256, 272 or 288 pages, for instance, is an "even working", whilst a book with 254 or 286 pages is not. The significance of 16 or 32, which form the individual "signatures" of which a book is composed, is that they make the most efficient use of the paper used in the printing of a book. If the number of printed pages in a book is, for example, 258, then the editor will attempt to move material from the two extra pages so that there will not be 14 blank pages at the end of the book (the next even working after 256 being 272 pages).
