= Hearts in Unicode =

Emoji and others representing or depicting heart shapes

As a common symbol throughout typographic history, the heart shape has become part of many character sets and encodings, including those of Unicode. Some characters depict the shape directly, others reference it in a more derived manner.

== History ==
The Red Heart emoji as it appears on a variety of platforms (clockwise: Twitter's Twemoji, Google's Noto, EmojiOne, OpenMoji)

In the 1990s, NTT DoCoMo released a pager that was aimed at teenagers. The pager was the first of its kind to include the option to send a pictogram as part of the text. The pager only had a single pictogram on its options, which was a heart-shaped pictogram. This is thought to be Shigetaka Kurita's first exposure to the use of digital symbols in text form. The pager received rave reviews in Asia which led to other companies in the region to consider using pictograms in the list of text characters. NTT DoCoMo then released another pager aimed at businesspeople, but this time dropped the heart pictogram from the characters on the pager. Following its release, there was an outcry by users that the pictogram was no longer available, and many customers switched to other providers that had now included a heart pictogram in their markup. This led NTT DoCoMo to reverse their decision and include the heart pictogram.

As the emoji became more popular, other heart colours were launched by Unicode. Since then, each heart color has been given its own meaning.

In early 2022, Middle Eastern news publications suggested that sending a Red Heart emoji on WhatsApp in Saudi Arabia could amount to harassment and if convicted, the sender could serve a maximum sentence of two years in jail.

== Notable characters ==
=== Red heart ===
The red heart (❤️) emoji is an ideogram that is used in communication to express care and as a romantic or love gesture. It is frequently seen as the most popular emoji in surveys conducted by NTT DoCoMo.

=== Smiling face with heart-shaped eyes ===
The Heart Eyes (😍) emoji is to express happiness towards something. The Unicode Consortium listed it as the third most used emoji in 2019, behind the Red Heart and Face with Tears of Joy emoji. It frequently appears in the top 10 lists for the most common emoji.

=== Hairy heart ===
The yellow heart emoji ⟨💛⟩ is mistakenly displayed as a pink "hairy heart" ⟨⟩ in Google's Android 4.4 mobile operating system (released 2013) because Google's emoji art team misinterpreted the dots in Unicode's black-and-white reference images ⟨⟩ as being hair stubble. In reality, the dotted pattern is simply used as a colorless way to represent the color yellow (in accordance with heraldic hatching). The error was fixed in version 4.4.1 a few months later.

U+1F49B 💛 YELLOW HEART in the Unicode reference

Typical yellow heart emoji, by Noto fonts

Yellow heart in Android 4.4, represented as pink and hairy due to an error

== Ideographic scripts ==
Some ideographic scripts include pictographs of hearts.

- U+2F3C KANGXI RADICAL HEART
- U+5FC3 心 CJK UNIFIED IDEOGRAPH-5FC3
- U+13123 EGYPTIAN HIEROGLYPH F034

== Encoding ==
A common emoticon for the heart is <3. In Unicode several heart symbols are available in text format:

Glyph	Description	HTML code	Alt codes
❦	U+2766 FLORAL HEART	&#x2766;	
❧	U+2767 ROTATED FLORAL HEART BULLET	&#x2767;	
☙	U+2619 REVERSED ROTATED FLORAL HEART BULLET	&#x2619;	
♡	U+2661 WHITE HEART SUIT	&#x2661; or &#9825;	
♥	U+2665 BLACK HEART SUIT in device default representation	&#x2665; or &#9829; or &hearts;	Alt + 3
♥︎	U+2665 BLACK HEART SUIT in explicit plaintext representation	&#x2665;&#xfe0e;	
♥️	U+2665 BLACK HEART SUIT in explicit emoji representation	&#x2665;&#xfe0f;	
❤	U+2764 HEAVY BLACK HEART in device default representation	&#x2764; or &#10084;	
❤︎	U+2764 HEAVY BLACK HEART in explicit plaintext representation	&#x2764;&#xfe0e;	
❤️	U+2764 HEAVY BLACK HEART in explicit emoji representation	&#x2764;&#xfe0f;	
❥	U+2765 ROTATED HEAVY BLACK HEART BULLET	&#x2765; or &#10085;	
❣	U+2763 HEAVY HEART EXCLAMATION MARK ORNAMENT	&#x2763; or &#10083;	
🎔	U+1F394 HEART WITH TIP ON THE LEFT	&#x1f394;	

In Code page 437, the original character set of the IBM PC, the value of 3 (hexadecimal 03) represents the heart suit symbol. This value is shared with the non-printing ETX control character, which overrides the glyph in many contexts.

== List of heart-related emojis ==
The single Unicode character heart related emojis can be found on the Miscellaneous Symbols and Pictographs, Supplemental Symbols and Pictographs, and Symbols and Pictographs Extended-A ranges.

Glyph	Unicode name	Codepoints	Skin tone variants
♥️	Black Heart Suit	U+2665 U+FE0F	
❣️	Heavy Heart Exclamation Mark Ornament	U+2763 U+FE0F	
❤️	Heavy Black Heart	U+2764 U+FE0F	
🏩	Love Hotel	U+1F3E9	
💌	Love Letter	U+1F48C	
💏	Kiss	U+1F48F	💏🏻 💏🏼 💏🏽 💏🏾 💏🏿 🧑🏻‍❤️‍💋‍🧑🏽 🧑🏻‍❤️‍💋‍🧑🏾 🧑🏻‍❤️‍💋‍🧑🏿 🧑🏼‍❤️‍💋‍🧑🏻 🧑🏼‍❤️‍💋‍🧑🏽 🧑🏼‍❤️‍💋‍🧑🏾 🧑🏼‍❤️‍💋‍🧑🏿 🧑🏽‍❤️‍💋‍🧑🏻 🧑🏽‍❤️‍💋‍🧑🏼 🧑🏽‍❤️‍💋‍🧑🏾 🧑🏽‍❤️‍💋‍🧑🏿 🧑🏾‍❤️‍💋‍🧑🏻 🧑🏾‍❤️‍💋‍🧑🏼 🧑🏾‍❤️‍💋‍🧑🏽 🧑🏾‍❤️‍💋‍🧑🏿 🧑🏿‍❤️‍💋‍🧑🏻 🧑🏿‍❤️‍💋‍🧑🏼 🧑🏿‍❤️‍💋‍🧑🏽
👨‍❤️‍💋‍👨	Kiss: Man, Man	U+1F468 U+200D U+2764 U+FE0F U+200D U+1F48B U+200D U+1F468	👨🏻‍❤️‍💋‍👨🏻 👨🏻‍❤️‍💋‍👨🏼 👨🏻‍❤️‍💋‍👨🏽 👨🏻‍❤️‍💋‍👨🏾 👨🏻‍❤️‍💋‍👨🏿 👨🏼‍❤️‍💋‍👨🏻 👨🏼‍❤️‍💋‍👨🏼 👨🏼‍❤️‍💋‍👨🏽 👨🏼‍❤️‍💋‍👨🏾 👨🏼‍❤️‍💋‍👨🏿 👨🏽‍❤️‍💋‍👨🏻 👨🏽‍❤️‍💋‍👨🏼 👨🏽‍❤️‍💋‍👨🏽 👨🏽‍❤️‍💋‍👨🏾 👨🏽‍❤️‍💋‍👨🏿 👨🏾‍❤️‍💋‍👨🏻 👨🏾‍❤️‍💋‍👨🏼 👨🏾‍❤️‍💋‍👨🏽 👨🏾‍❤️‍💋‍👨🏾 👨🏾‍❤️‍💋‍👨🏿 👨🏿‍❤️‍💋‍👨🏻 👨🏿‍❤️‍💋‍👨🏼 👨🏿‍❤️‍💋‍👨🏽 👨🏿‍❤️‍💋‍👨🏾 👨🏿‍❤️‍💋‍👨🏿
👩‍❤️‍💋‍👩	Kiss: Woman, Woman	U+1F469 U+200D U+2764 U+FE0F U+200D U+1F48B U+200D U+1F469	👩🏻‍❤️‍💋‍👩🏻 👩🏻‍❤️‍💋‍👩🏼 👩🏻‍❤️‍💋‍👩🏽 👩🏻‍❤️‍💋‍👩🏾 👩🏻‍❤️‍💋‍👩🏿 👩🏼‍❤️‍💋‍👩🏻 👩🏼‍❤️‍💋‍👩🏼 👩🏼‍❤️‍💋‍👩🏽 👩🏼‍❤️‍💋‍👩🏾 👩🏼‍❤️‍💋‍👩🏿 👩🏽‍❤️‍💋‍👩🏻 👩🏽‍❤️‍💋‍👩🏼 👩🏽‍❤️‍💋‍👩🏽 👩🏽‍❤️‍💋‍👩🏾 👩🏽‍❤️‍💋‍👩🏿 👩🏾‍❤️‍💋‍👩🏻 👩🏾‍❤️‍💋‍👩🏼 👩🏾‍❤️‍💋‍👩🏽 👩🏾‍❤️‍💋‍👩🏾 👩🏾‍❤️‍💋‍👩🏿 👩🏿‍❤️‍💋‍👩🏻 👩🏿‍❤️‍💋‍👩🏼 👩🏿‍❤️‍💋‍👩🏽 👩🏿‍❤️‍💋‍👩🏾 👩🏿‍❤️‍💋‍👩🏿
👩‍❤️‍💋‍👨	Kiss: Woman, Man	U+1F469 U+200D U+2764 U+FE0F U+200D U+1F48B U+200D U+1F468	👩🏻‍❤️‍💋‍👨🏻 👩🏻‍❤️‍💋‍👨🏼 👩🏻‍❤️‍💋‍👨🏽 👩🏻‍❤️‍💋‍👨🏾 👩🏻‍❤️‍💋‍👨🏿 👩🏼‍❤️‍💋‍👨🏻 👩🏼‍❤️‍💋‍👨🏼 👩🏼‍❤️‍💋‍👨🏽 👩🏼‍❤️‍💋‍👨🏾 👩🏼‍❤️‍💋‍👨🏿 👩🏽‍❤️‍💋‍👨🏻 👩🏽‍❤️‍💋‍👨🏼 👩🏽‍❤️‍💋‍👨🏽 👩🏽‍❤️‍💋‍👨🏾 👩🏽‍❤️‍💋‍👨🏿 👩🏾‍❤️‍💋‍👨🏻 👩🏾‍❤️‍💋‍👨🏼 👩🏾‍❤️‍💋‍👨🏽 👩🏾‍❤️‍💋‍👨🏾 👩🏾‍❤️‍💋‍👨🏿 👩🏿‍❤️‍💋‍👨🏻 👩🏿‍❤️‍💋‍👨🏼 👩🏿‍❤️‍💋‍👨🏽 👩🏿‍❤️‍💋‍👨🏾 👩🏿‍❤️‍💋‍👨🏿
💑	Couple with Heart	U+1F491	💑🏻 💑🏼 💑🏽 💑🏾 💑🏿 🧑🏻‍❤️‍🧑🏼 🧑🏻‍❤️‍🧑🏽 🧑🏻‍❤️‍🧑🏾 🧑🏻‍❤️‍🧑🏿 🧑🏼‍❤️‍🧑🏻 🧑🏼‍❤️‍🧑🏽 🧑🏼‍❤️‍🧑🏾 🧑🏼‍❤️‍🧑🏿 🧑🏽‍❤️‍🧑🏻 🧑🏽‍❤️‍🧑🏼 🧑🏽‍❤️‍🧑🏾 🧑🏽‍❤️‍🧑🏿 🧑🏾‍❤️‍🧑🏻 🧑🏾‍❤️‍🧑🏼 🧑🏾‍❤️‍🧑🏽 🧑🏾‍❤️‍🧑🏿 🧑🏿‍❤️‍🧑🏻 🧑🏿‍❤️‍🧑🏼 🧑🏿‍❤️‍🧑🏽 🧑🏿‍❤️‍🧑🏾
👨‍❤️‍👨	Couple with Heart: Man, Man	U+1F468 U+200D U+2764 U+FE0F U+200D U+1F468	👨🏻‍❤️‍👨🏻 👨🏻‍❤️‍👨🏼 👨🏻‍❤️‍👨🏽 👨🏻‍❤️‍👨🏾 👨🏻‍❤️‍👨🏿 👨🏼‍❤️‍👨🏻 👨🏼‍❤️‍👨🏼 👨🏼‍❤️‍👨🏽 👨🏼‍❤️‍👨🏾 👨🏼‍❤️‍👨🏿 👨🏽‍❤️‍👨🏻 👨🏽‍❤️‍👨🏼 👨🏽‍❤️‍👨🏽 👨🏽‍❤️‍👨🏾 👨🏽‍❤️‍👨🏿 👨🏾‍❤️‍👨🏻 👨🏾‍❤️‍👨🏼 👨🏾‍❤️‍👨🏽 👨🏾‍❤️‍👨🏾 👨🏾‍❤️‍👨🏿 👨🏿‍❤️‍👨🏻 👨🏿‍❤️‍👨🏼 👨🏿‍❤️‍👨🏽 👨🏿‍❤️‍👨🏾 👨🏿‍❤️‍👨🏿
👩‍❤️‍👩	Couple with Heart: Woman, Woman	U+1F469 U+200D U+2764 U+FE0F U+200D U+1F469	👩🏻‍❤️‍👩🏻 👩🏻‍❤️‍👩🏼 👩🏻‍❤️‍👩🏽 👩🏻‍❤️‍👩🏾 👩🏻‍❤️‍👩🏿 👩🏼‍❤️‍👩🏻 👩🏼‍❤️‍👩🏼 👩🏼‍❤️‍👩🏽 👩🏼‍❤️‍👩🏾 👩🏼‍❤️‍👩🏿 👩🏽‍❤️‍👩🏻 👩🏽‍❤️‍👩🏼 👩🏽‍❤️‍👩🏽 👩🏽‍❤️‍👩🏾 👩🏽‍❤️‍👩🏿 👩🏾‍❤️‍👩🏻 👩🏾‍❤️‍👩🏼 👩🏾‍❤️‍👩🏽 👩🏾‍❤️‍👩🏾 👩🏾‍❤️‍👩🏿 👩🏿‍❤️‍👩🏻 👩🏿‍❤️‍👩🏼 👩🏿‍❤️‍👩🏽 👩🏿‍❤️‍👩🏾 👩🏿‍❤️‍👩🏿
👩‍❤️‍👨	Couple with Heart: Woman, Man	U+1F469 U+200D U+2764 U+FE0F U+200D U+1F468	👩🏻‍❤️‍👨🏻 👩🏻‍❤️‍👨🏼 👩🏻‍❤️‍👨🏽 👩🏻‍❤️‍👨🏾 👩🏻‍❤️‍👨🏿 👩🏼‍❤️‍👨🏻 👩🏼‍❤️‍👨🏼 👩🏼‍❤️‍👨🏽 👩🏼‍❤️‍👨🏾 👩🏼‍❤️‍👨🏿 👩🏽‍❤️‍👨🏻 👩🏽‍❤️‍👨🏼 👩🏽‍❤️‍👨🏽 👩🏽‍❤️‍👨🏾 👩🏽‍❤️‍👨🏿 👩🏾‍❤️‍👨🏻 👩🏾‍❤️‍👨🏼 👩🏾‍❤️‍👨🏽 👩🏾‍❤️‍👨🏾 👩🏾‍❤️‍👨🏿 👩🏿‍❤️‍👨🏻 👩🏿‍❤️‍👨🏼 👩🏿‍❤️‍👨🏽 👩🏿‍❤️‍👨🏾 👩🏿‍❤️‍👨🏿
💒	Wedding	U+1F492	
💓	Beating Heart	U+1F493	
💔	Broken Heart	U+1F494	
💕	Two Hearts	U+1F495	
💖	Sparkling Heart	U+1F496	
💗	Growing Heart	U+1F497	
💘	Heart with Arrow	U+1F498	
💙	Blue Heart	U+1F499	
💚	Green Heart	U+1F49A	
💛	Yellow Heart	U+1F49B	
💜	Purple Heart	U+1F49C	
💝	Heart with Ribbon	U+1F49D	
💞	Revolving Hearts	U+1F49E	
💟	Heart Decoration	U+1F49F	
🖤	Black Heart	U+1F5A4	
😍	Smiling Face with Heart-Shaped Eyes	U+1F60D	
😘	Face Blowing a Kiss	U+1F618	
😻	Smiling Cat Face with Heart-Shaped Eyes	U+1F63B	
🤍	White Heart	U+1F90D	
🤎	Brown Heart	U+1F90E	
🥰	Smiling Face with Hearts	U+1F970	
🧡	Orange Heart	U+1F9E1	
🩵	Light Blue Heart	U+1FA75	
🩶	Grey Heart	U+1FA76	
🩷	Pink Heart	U+1FA77	
🫀	Anatomical Heart	U+1FAC0	
❤️‍🩹	Mending Heart	U+2764 U+FE0F U+200D U+1FA79	
❤️‍🔥	Heart on Fire	U+2764 U+FE0F U+200D U+1F525	
🫶	Heart Hands	U+1FAF6	🫶🏻🫶🏼🫶🏽🫶🏾🫶🏿
🫰	Hand with Index Finger and Thumb Crossed	U+1FAF0	🫰🏻🫰🏼🫰🏽🫰🏾🫰🏿

== See also ==
- The playing cards in Unicode include characters for the cards of the heart suit of the French deck.
