= 樂天 =

樂天, 楽天, 乐天 or 낙천, meaning "optimism", may refer to:

- Bai Juyi, courtesy name Letian (樂天), Chinese musician, poet, and politician during the Tang dynasty
- Jungjong of Joseon, courtesy name Nakcheon (낙천, 樂天), ruler of the Joseon dynasty of Korea
- Optimism (樂天), 2001 album by Hong Kong singer Louis Koo
- Rakuten (楽天), Japanese technology conglomerate

== See also ==
- Optimism (disambiguation)
