= Maximal =

Maximal may refer to:

- Maximal element, a mathematical definition
- Maximal set, a concept in computability theory
- Maximal (Transformers), a faction of Transformers
- Maximalism, an artistic style
- Maxim (magazine), a men's magazine marketed as Maximal in several countries

== See also ==
- Minimal (disambiguation)
