= Minimalism (disambiguation) =

Minimalism is a movement in visual arts, music, and other media that began in post–World War II Western art.

Minimalism may also refer to:

- Minimalism (computing), a philosophy of programming and configuring computers
- Minimalism (philosophy), a theory that truth does not provide useful information beyond the proposition or sentence
- Minimalism (syntax), a theory of natural language syntax developed by Noam Chomsky in the 1990s, also known as Minimalist program
- Minimalism (technical communication), a theory of task-oriented and user-centered instruction and documentation
- Minimalism (visual arts), art movement to expose the essence, essentials or identity of a subject through eliminating all non-essential forms, features or concepts
- Minimalist music, a form of art music that employs limited or minimal musical materials
- Judicial minimalism, a philosophy in United States constitutional law
- Biblical minimalism, a movement or trend in biblical scholarship holding that the Bible is not reliable evidence for history, and that "Israel" is a problematic subject for historical study
- Simple living, voluntary practices to simplify one's lifestyle by reducing one's possessions

== See also ==
- Minimal (disambiguation)
- Minimisation (disambiguation)
- Concision
