= Optimistic (disambiguation) =

Optimistic is the adjective form of the word optimism.

Optimistic may also refer to:

- Optimistic bias in psychology
- Optimistic Cave, Korolivka, Borshchiv Raion, Ternopil Oblast, Ukraine; a gypsum cave
- "Optimistic" (Skeeter Davis song), 1961
- "Optimistic" (Radiohead song), 2000
- "Optimistic" (Sounds of Blackness song), 1991

== See also ==
- "Be Optimistic", a song performed by Shirley Temple from Little Miss Broadway
- An Optimistic Tragedy (play), a 1933 Soviet stageplay
- An Optimistic Tragedy (film), a 1968 Soviet film
- Optimistic concurrency control in computing
- Optimistic heuristic in computer science
- Optimist (disambiguation)
- Optimism (disambiguation)
- Optimization (disambiguation)
- Optimum (disambiguation)
