= Optimist (disambiguation) =

An optimist is a person with a positive outlook on life.

Optimist, (The) Optimist(s), or similar may also refer to:

== Albums and songs ==
- The Optimist LP and The Optimist Live, albums by Turin Brakes
- The Optimist (Anathema album), 2017, or the title song
- The Optimist (DD Smash album), 1984, or the title song
- The Optimist (New Young Pony Club album), 2010, or the title song
- Optimist (album), a 2021 album by Finneas O'Connell
- "The Optimist", a song from The Dreams on their 2010 album Revolt
- "The Optimist", a song by Emma Pollock from her 2007 album Watch the Fireworks
- "The Optimist", an EP by Evie Irie

== Film and television ==
- The Optimist (TV series), a 1983 British television comedy series
- The Optimist (film), a 1938 German film directed by E.W. Emo
- The Optimists (film), a 2006 Serbian film directed by Goran Paskaljević
- The Optimists of Nine Elms, a 1974 British film also known as The Optimists
- The Optimists (original title: Оптимисты), a 2017 Russian historical drama series directed by Alexei Popogrebski
- The Optimist, a 2023 film directed by Finn Taylor

== Other uses ==
- Optimist (dinghy), a class of small sailing dinghy intended for use by children
- The Optimists (novel), a 2005 novel by Andrew Miller\
- The Optimist (alternate reality game), a 2013 game created by Walt Disney Imagineering
- A member of Optimist International
- The Optimist, the student newspaper of Abilene Christian University

== See also ==
- Optimistic (disambiguation)
- Optimism (disambiguation)
- Optimization (disambiguation)
- Optimum (disambiguation)
