= Optimism (disambiguation) =

Optimism is an attitude for outcomes to be positive, favorable, desirable.

Optimism may also refer to:

- Optimism (blockchain), an Ethereum layer 2 blockchain
- Candide, or Optimism (aka: Optimism, Canadide), a satire by Voltaire
- Optimism Monthly Magazine (1995-2009), a Czech literary magazine
- Optimism Press, an imprint of Penguin Random House founded by Simon Sinek
- "Optimism", a 1974 song from the album Lady June's Linguistic Leprosy
- "Optimism", a 2020 song by Spanish Loves Songs from the album Brave Faces Everyone
- "Optimism", a 2018 episode of the TV series Supernatural in season 14
- "Optimism", a 1903 essay by Helen Keller
- OPTIMISM (Operational Perseverance Twin for Integration of Mechanisms and Instruments Sent to Mars), an engineering model of the NASA-JPL 2020 Mars rover Perseverance

== See also ==
- Candide, or Optimism Part II
- Optimism Records
- Optimist (disambiguation)
- Optimistic (disambiguation)
- Optimization (disambiguation)
- Optimum (disambiguation)
- 樂天 (disambiguation)
