= Optimal sorting =

Optimal sorting may refer to:

- in a sequential context, an optimal comparison sort
- in a parallel context, an optimal sorting network
