= Minimal prime =

In mathematics, the term minimal prime may refer to

- Minimal prime ideal, in commutative algebra
- Minimal prime (recreational mathematics), the minimal prime number satisfying some property
