= Thermal optimum =

A thermal optimum is either a portion of a geological time span in which the average temperature was above that of the average temperature for the entire specified time; the optimum range within which a biological process may take place; or the ambient optimal range for a species' niche.

== Geology ==
In geology, scientists speak of a Holocene thermal optimum or maximum, for example, when referring to the warm period from 7000 to 2500 BC, in which an overall rise in average temperature is seen in evidence from ice cores and from stable isotope data.

== Biology ==
=== Process ===
A thermal optimum delimits the ideal boundaries for biological processes such as growth and development, and is specific to a species or population. Most biological processes are dependent upon enzymatic activity. Each enzyme has a temperature window in which it can function properly. Body temperature is a function of the organism's metabolism and environment. An organism's niche in the environment may then be dependent upon the thermal optima for its essential biological processes.

Thermal optima vary for each species and dictate the species' tolerance of environmental conditions. For example, for organisms inhabiting shorelines, exposure to sunlight when the tide is out and loss of buffering effects of water due to its specific heat capacity may contribute to increased desiccation. Habitats much match each species' thermal optima. External influences such as predation may also be limited by predator species' thermal optimum.
