= Minimisation =

Minimisation or minimization may refer to:

- Minimisation (psychology), downplaying the significance of an event or emotion
- Minimisation (clinical trials)
- Minimisation (code) or Minification, removing unnecessary characters from source code
- Structural risk minimization
- Boolean minimization, a technique for optimizing combinational digital circuits
- Cost-minimization analysis, in pharmacoeconomics
- Expenditure minimization problem, in microeconomics
- Waste minimisation
- Harm reduction
- Maxima and minima, in mathematical analysis
- Minimal element of a partial order, in mathematics
- Minimax approximation algorithm
- Minimisation operator ("μ operator"), the add-on to primitive recursion to obtain μ-recursive functions in computer science

== See also ==
- Optimization (mathematics)
- Minimal (disambiguation)
- Minimalism (disambiguation)
- Minification (disambiguation)
- Maximisation (disambiguation)
- Magnification
- Plateau's problem
