= Maximization =

Maximization or maximisation may refer to:

- Maximization in the sense of exaggeration
- Entropy maximization
- Maximization (economics)
  - Profit maximization
  - Utility maximization problem
  - Budget-maximizing model
  - Shareholder value, maximization
- Maximization (psychology)
- Optimization (mathematics)
- Expectation–maximization algorithm

== See also ==
- Minimization (disambiguation)
