= CCA =

CCA may refer to:

== Arts and culture ==
- Canadian Centre for Architecture, museum and research centre in Montreal, Quebec
- Canadian Comedy Awards, annual awards show
- CCA, a London-based talent agency founded by Howard Pays and Freddy Vale
- Capitol Center for the Arts, performing arts theater complex in Concord, New Hampshire
- Center for Contemporary Art Kitakyushu, art museum in Japan
- Centre for Contemporary Arts, arts centre in Glasgow, Scotland
- Centre for Curating the Archive, curation studio at the University of Cape Town, South Africa
- Chinese Calligraphers Association, a professional organization of Chinese calligraphers

== Computing ==
- Carry Cancel Adder, a type of adder lets a carry bypass an entire block of bits when every bit in that block is capable of propagating the carry.
- Chosen-ciphertext attack, attack model for cryptanalysis where the cryptanalyst can gather information by obtaining the decryptions of chosen ciphertexts
- Cisco Clean Access, former name of Cisco NAC Appliance, a defunct network admission control system
- Common Component Architecture, standard for component-based software engineering
- Connected-component analysis, algorithmic application of graph theory
- Continuous configuration automation, methodology or process of automating the deployment and configuration of settings and software

== Economics and finance ==
- Canadian Council on Africa, nonprofit dedicated to Africa's economic development
- Capital Cost Allowance, means by which Canadian businesses may claim depreciation expense when filing taxes
- Chartered Certified Accountant (designatory letters ACCA or FCCA)
- Chartered Cost Accountant, cost accounting or cost control professional designation under the American Academy of Financial Management
- Client commission agreement, soft dollar arrangement that allows money managers to separately pay executing brokers for trade execution and ask that broker to allocate a portion of the commission directly to an independent research provider
- Capital Consumption Allowance, business term referring to the portion of gross domestic product which is due to depreciation

== Education ==
- City College of Angeles, a public local college in Angeles City, Pampanga, Philippines
- California Charter Academy, defunct charter school operator in California
- California College of the Arts, private art school in San Francisco
- California Culinary Academy, defunct for-profit school affiliated with Le Cordon Bleu in San Francisco
- Canyon Crest Academy, public high school in San Diego, California
- Cape Cod Academy, independent college preparatory school in Massachusetts
- Chandigarh College of Architecture, architecture school in India
- Coláiste Chraobh Abhann, community secondary school in County Wicklow, Ireland
- Commonwealth Charter Academy
- Community College of Aurora, community college in Colorado
- Cornish College of the Arts, private art college in Seattle, Washington
- Clacton Coastal Academy, public secondary school in Essex, England
- Co-curricular activity (Singapore), non-academic activities students are required to take as part of their education

== Government, politics, and military ==
- Central Computer Agency, a former British government agency
- Climate Change Agreement, British scheme to make energy and carbon savings through energy efficiency while still maintaining competitiveness by reducing energy costs in certain industrial sectors
- Climate Change Authority, Australian governmental agency on climate change policy
- Collaborative combat aircraft, American program for unmanned combat air vehicles
- Combat Command-A, a combined-arms military organization of the U.S. Army from 1942 to 1963
- Combatant Clergy Association, political group in Iran
- Communist Committees for Self-Management (Comités communistes pour l'autogestion), a far-left French organization 1977–1982
- Council for Cultural Affairs, now the Ministry of Culture in Taiwan
- Cumbria Combined Authority, England

== Law ==
- Child Citizenship Act of 2000, American federal law regarding acquisition of citizenship by children of US citizens
- Civil Contingencies Act 2004, British act of Parliament that makes provision about civil contingencies
- Clinger–Cohen Act, two laws passed together in the United States in 1996
- Communist Control Act of 1954, American law outlawing the Communist Party and criminalizing membership or support
- Competition and Consumer Act 2010, Australian Act of Parliament promoting competition, fair trading as well as providing protection for consumers
- Consumer Credit Act 1974, British act of Parliament reforming consumer credit law
- Court of Criminal Appeal (disambiguation)

== Medicine and health ==
- Children's Craniofacial Association, American nonprofit to support individuals and families with facial disfigurements
- Cholangiocarcinoma, a type of cancer that forms in the bile ducts
- Common carotid artery, arteries supplying oxygenated blood to the head and neck
- Congenital contractural arachnodactyly, an autosomal dominant congenital connective tissue disorder

== Religion ==
- Catholic Campaign for America, defunct Roman Catholic activist organization
- Christian Coalition of America, nonprofit Christian advocacy group
- Christian Conference of Asia, regional ecumenical organisation in Asia, Oceania and Australia
- Cornerstone Christian Academy (disambiguation)
- Covenant Christian Academy (disambiguation)

== Science and technology ==
- Canonical correlation analysis, a way of inferring information from cross-covariance matrices
- Canonical correspondence analysis, a variation of correspondence analysis
- CCA, a codon for the amino acid proline
- Chromated copper arsenate, wood preservative
- Circuit card assembly, ICP preferred term for an assembled circuit board
- Climate change adaptation, process of adjusting to the effects of climate change
- Cold cranking amperes, a measurement on a vehicle battery
- Combinatorial clock auction, combination of a clock auction with a subsequent sealed bid auction
- Computer Corporation of America, a former computer software company
- Compositionally Complex Alloys, or Complex Concentrated Alloys, baseless alloys, e.g., like a High-entropy alloy
- Confirmatory composite analysis, sub-type of structural equation modeling
- Copper-clad aluminium wire, dual-metal electrical conductor composed of an inner aluminum core and outer copper cladding
- Council of Canadian Academies, nonprofit in Ontario that performs independent, expert assessments of science relevant to public issues
- Currency Creek Arboretum, abortorium and research center in South Australia

== Sports ==
- Canadian Canoe Association, governing body of competitive canoeing and kayaking
- Canadian Cricket Association, now Cricket Canada, governing body of competitive cricket
- Canadian Curling Association, now Curling Canada, sanctioning body for competitive curling
- Canadian Cycling Association, now Cycling Canada, governing body of competitive cycle racing
- Chinese Chess Association, governing body of competitive chess
- Cruising Club of America, international organization promoting cruising and racing and its development

== Transportation ==
- CCA, the ICAO callsign for Air China
- Central Connect Airlines, a former airline based in the Czech Republic

== Unions and professional associations ==
- Canadian Cattle Association, an advocacy group for the Canadian beef industry
- Certified Crop Advisor, professional designation under the American Society of Agronomy
- China Cotton Association, nonprofit specializing in cotton
- Comics Code Authority, American organisation that oversaw ethics and standards for comics publishing
- Conference of Consulting Actuaries, professional society of actuaries in the USA and Canada
- Corporate Council on Africa, nonprofit trade association focused on strengthening commercial relationships between the USA and Africa
- Critics Choice Association, American association for television, radio and online critics

== Other uses ==
- Canadian Cat Association, nonprofit dedicated to cat welfare
- Canadian Cascade Arc, the Canadian segment of the North American Cascade Volcanic Arc
- Club Corporation of Asia, Hong Kong-based company and leaseholder for Brocket Hall in Hertfordshire, England
- Coastal Conservation Association, American nonprofit social movement organization of salt water anglers
- Coca-Cola Amatil, a bottler of beverages in the Asia-Pacific region
- Community Choice Aggregation, American nonprofit public agencies that offer an alternative to investor-owned utilities systems
- Community Conservation Areas, community conserved territories and areas governed with evidently positive outcomes for the conservation of biological and cultural diversity
- Compañía Colombiana Automotriz, a former car factory in Colombia
- Concerned Children's Advertisers, former name of Companies Committed to Kids, a defunct Canadian non-profit organization
- Container Corporation of America, American company that manufactured corregated boxes
- Corrections Corporation of America, now CoreCivic, company that owns and manages private prisons and detention centers

== See also ==
- Circa (disambiguation)
