= Control-K =

Computer keyboard command

Control-K is a computer command. It is generated by pressing the K key while holding down the Ctrl key on most computer keyboards. Control-K may perform a variety of functions in different systems.

In hypertext environments that use the control key to control the active program, control-K is often used to add, edit, or modify a hyperlink to a Web page. For example, this key combination is used in Windows versions of Microsoft Word and in many browser-based content management systems.

In the Bash shell control-k erases text from the cursor to the end of the current line.

== See also ==
- C0 and C1 control codes
- Control-C
- Control-D
- Control-V
- Control-X
- Control-Z
- Control-\
- Keyboard shortcut
