= Control-Y =

Computer command

Control-Y is a common computer command. It is generated by holding Ctrl and pressing the Y key on most computer keyboards.

In most Windows applications this keyboard shortcut functions as Redo, reversing a previous Undo. In some programs such as Microsoft Office it repeats the previous action if it was something other than Undo.

Apple Macintosh systems use ⌘ Command+⇧ Shift+Z for Redo. In general a shortcut on Macintosh using ⌘ Command matches up with a shortcut on Windows using Ctrl, this is one of the most noticeable conflicts. Many programs (on all systems including Linux) support both Ctrl+Y and Ctrl+⇧ Shift+Z for Redo to resolve this conflict. But quite a few remain where only one or the other shortcut works.

== Other uses ==
The OpenVMS operating system command-line uses Ctrl+Y as its "abort" character, stronger in effect than the ordinary Ctrl+C "interrupt" character.

Ctrl+Y deleted the current line in the WordStar word processor for CP/M and MS-DOS. In the 1980s, many text editors and word processors mimicked the WordStar command set, making Ctrl+Y a common synonym for "delete line."

In Borland IDEs it also deletes the current line.

In emacs it does a paste action (known as "yank"). Emacs uses Ctrl+/ for Undo and Redo.

In vi and vim it scrolls the display up one line.

In the pico and nano text editors this shortcut scrolls one page up.

In SAP GUI it enters block-select mode.

== See also ==
- Undo / redo
- Cut, copy, and paste
- Ctrl-Z
