= Cornerstone Christian School =

Cornerstone Christian School may refer to:

- Cornerstone Christian School (Camarillo, California)
- Cornerstone Christian School (Albion, Indiana)
- Cornerstone Christian School, Palmerston North

== See also ==
- Cornerstone Christian Academy
