= Edit menu =

Common graphic widget in computer software

The Edit menu is a menu-type graphical control element found in most computer programs that handle files, text or images. It is often the second menu in the menu bar, next to the file menu.

Whereas the file menu commonly contains commands about handling of files, such as open, save, and print, the edit menu commonly contains commands relating to the handling of information within a file, e.g. cut and paste and selection commands. In addition, it may also be home to the undo and redo commands, especially in word processors. It may also contain commands for locating information, e.g. find commands. In graphics-oriented programs, it often contains commands relating to the manipulation of images, for example the crop command.
