= Control-\ =

In computing, control-\ is a control character in ASCII code and the Basic Latin code block of Unicode, also known as the file separator or field separator (FS) character. It is generated by pressing the \ key while holding down the Ctrl key on a computer keyboard, and has the decimal value 28 (or 1c in hexadecimal). It is the highest-level of the four separators in the ASCII C0 and C1 control codes; the others are control-] (group separator), control-^ (record separator), and control-_ (unit separator). It was one of eight codes reserved as separators in the 1963 version of the ASCII standard; these were reduced to four separators in a 1965 revision of the standard.

In its use as a file separator, this character can be used to subdivide textual data into records or other semantic units; for instance, it has this role in the ANSI/NIST-ITL Standard Data Format for the Interchange of Fingerprint, Facial & Other Biometric Information.

Under most UNIX-based operating systems control-\ is used to terminate a running process from a command shell and have it produce a memory core dump by sending it a SIGQUIT signal. Other similar ways of terminating or interrupting a shell process include Control-C, Control-Z, and the kill command.

As a character that can be easily typed on most keyboards, but with no standardized meaning, control-\ is often used as a keyboard shortcut in different graphical user interfaces, with various unrelated effects. For instance, some versions of Windows File Manager use it to de-select all selected files. In Adobe InDesign, it has been used to mark a point in a line of text as the starting position of a hanging indent.
