= Mount Otzi Central Forest Reserve =

Forest reserve in Uganda

Coordinates: 3.714°N 31.893°E

- Mount Otzi forest
- IUCN category III (natural monument or feature)
- Location: West Nile Sub Region, Uganda
- Nearest city: Moyo district
- Area: 18,800 ha (46,000 acres)
- Governing body: Uganda Wildlife Authority

Mount Otzi Central Forest Reserve is a 188 square kilometer (18,800 hectares) forest reserve located in Moyo District, West Nile Region, Uganda. It is situated on an escarpment that overlooks the confluence of River Achwa and the White Nile as it flows into South Sudan. The reserve is bordered on the North by the International border of South Sudan and to the South by the Moyo-Adjumani District border. Mount Otzi Forest Reserve is an important place for the surrounding people because bamboo poles and other non-timber goods are crucial for building materials and also provide lumber. Not only that, but the National Forestry Authority Department has designated it as an Important Biodiversity Conservation Area due to its importance as a large water catchment area.

== Setting ==
The Mount Otzi Central Forest Reserve was established in 1933 to safeguard the water catchment area for the neighboring River Achwa. It also has a diverse plant and animal life, including chimps, elephants, and other bird species. The reserve is a popular place for birdwatching, hiking, and camping. There are numerous routes that go through the forest, and the views from the top of the escarpment are breathtaking. The forest reserve is managed by the Uganda Wildlife Authority (UWA). UWA is aiming to keep the reserve from further deterioration and to encourage sustainable tourism.

== History ==
Mount Otzi Forest Reserve was originally named the Moyo Forest Reserve, but it was renamed the Mount Otzi Forest Reserve in 2005.

About half of Mount Otzi Forest Reserve is Butyrospermum woodland savanna, with the rest being Combretum savanna with undifferentiated semi-deciduous thicket. Due to the reserve's minimal population density, as well as steep slopes and harsh terrain that impede farming, it is largely intact save for lightly encroached pockets, primarily at lower altitudes. The reserve is essential to locals for building materials, particularly bamboo poles and non-timber items; it is not vital for timber production. It is highly rated for biodiversity conservation. The forest is also essential as a source of water.

== Flora and fauna ==
The Mount Otzi Forest Reserve is home to a variety of plant and animal life. The forest is dominated by evergreen trees, such as mahogany, teak, and ironwood. There are also a number of deciduous trees, such as fig trees and baobab trees. Over 168 bird species have been identified. Falco alopex, a species limited to the Sudan-Guinea Savanna ecosystem, has only been recorded at one other location in Uganda, Kidepo Valley (IBA UG030). In terms of avifauna, this IBA is regarded one of the richest in northern Uganda, containing primarily open-habitat and savanna woodland species.

The reserve is home to a number of mammals, including chimpanzees, elephants, buffaloes, lions, leopards, and antelope. There are also a number of birds, reptiles, and amphibians. Otzi is home to three restricted-range small mammals, including the shrew Crocidura cyanea, which was previously thought to be a southern African species. Crocidura selina, formerly only known from Mabira Forest (and classified as endemic in Uganda with a limited range), has been discovered in Mount Otzi Forest Reserve.

Other notable bird species in the Forest Reserve include the purple glossy starling, the white chestnut turaco, black-bellied firefinch, the bronze-tailed glossy starlings, Red-throated bee-eater, Piapiac, foxy Cisticola, Uganda's spotted woodpecker, the brown-rumped bunting, Chestnut crowned sparrow weaver, red pate Cisticola, Emin's shrike and the black-rumped waxbill among others. Furthermore, a chimpanzee population was discovered in the Mount Otzi Forest Reserve during a survey in the 1990s, but their numbers and current status are unknown.

== Tourism ==
The Mount Otzi Forest Reserve is a popular destination for birdwatching, hiking, and camping. There are a number of trails that lead through the forest, and the views from the top of the escarpment are spectacular. The reserve is managed by the Uganda Wildlife Authority (UWA). UWA is working to protect the reserve from further degradation and to promote sustainable tourism.

== Conservation ==
Mount Otzi Forest Reserve is one of the most interesting places to visit within the West Nile region during Uganda safaris. It is a haven to over 261 tree species and more than 168 species of birds, but received fewer tourists thus greatly untouched. The Mount Otzi Forest Reserve is facing a number of threats, including logging, agricultural encroachment, and charcoal burning. The relative remoteness of this site limits management activity, but no serious threats are known, although more information is needed.

Due to the sparse population density around the reserve, as well as steep slopes and rugged terrain which limit cultivation, it is mainly intact except for light encroached enclaves, mainly at the lower altitudes. UWA is working to protect the reserve from these threats by working with local communities to raise awareness of the importance of the forest. UWA is also working to restore the reserve by planting trees and removing invasive species. The reserve is a valuable resource for the people of Uganda, and UWA is committed to protecting it for future generations.

Mt. Otzi Forest Reserve was established because of its rich biodiversity, but over the years it has been affected by anthropogenic and natural disturbances. The Forest Reserve's tree species distribution was significantly affected by altitude, fire, farm lands, fallow, and felling by cutting, according to Canonical Correspondence Analysis (CCA). Environmental pressures have impacted the diversity and distribution of some trees; consequently, techniques that account for fires, felling by cutting, and species with low stem density, particularly saplings, are required to conserve tree species in Mt. Otzi Forest Reserve.

== See also ==
- List of Central Forest Reserves of Uganda
