= Whitewater Resource Editor =

Whitewater Resource Editor was an early resource editor developed by the Whitewater Group for Microsoft Windows 3.11. The WYSIWYG editor allowed resources to be edited, created, and managed including accelerator keys, bit maps, cursor shapes, icons, dialog boxes, menus, and more.

The editor was included with Turbo Pascal, Zortech C++, Borland C++, and other SDKs/IDEs.
