= Adrian Brannan =

Scottish photographer

Adrian Brannan is a contemporary artist who works mainly in the medium of photo collage focusing on cityscapes as his most frequently chosen subject matter. Adrian has worked in this medium since studying at the Glasgow School of Art from where he graduated with Honours in 2000. He has exhibited in various UK locations including with the Royal Glasgow Institute for the Fine Arts, the Association of Photographers Gallery in London and The Glasgow Room. Adrian has won various awards from the likes of the Association of Photographers and Glasgow City Council.

In a time when the majority of image manipulators are using digital photography and post production software such as Adobe Photoshop Adrian has notably chosen to use traditional optical photography and manual 'cut and paste' collaging techniques in the pursuit of what he has described as a "more truthful and unclouded representation" of his subject matter.

Adrian has captured his hometown of Glasgow as well as being commissioned to create works in Barcelona, London and various areas in Switzerland. Adrian's work is held in public and private collections worldwide.
