= Mnemonic (disambiguation) =

A mnemonic is a memory aide.

Mnemonic(s) may also refer to:

- Mnemonic (assembly language), an operation code mnemonic used in assembly language programming
- Mnemonic (company), a Norwegian IT security company
- Keyboard mnemonic, the use of underlined characters in software user interfaces
- Mnemonic (play), a 1999 play created by Complicité
- "Mnemonics" (short story), a 1951 short story written by Kurt Vonnegut

== See also ==
- "Johnny Mnemonic", a 1981 short story by William Gibson
- Johnny Mnemonic (film), a 1995 cyberpunk film adapted from the short story
