= Atex =

Atex or ATEX may refer to:

- ATEX directive, either of two EU directives for safety requirements in explosive atmospheres
- Atex (software), a software company.
