= Page zooming =

Resizing of a digital document or image

In computing, page zooming is the ability to zoom in and out a document or image at page level. It is usually found in applications related to document layout and publishing, e.g. word processing and spreadsheet programs, and is also found in web browsers. It can be used to improve accessibility for people with visual impairment and people using mobile devices which have a relatively small screen.

== Different modes ==
There are several notably different modes of page zooming:

- Text resizing resizes the text by increasing or decreasing the font size, with wrapping to avoid horizontal scrolling, leaving the size of the images the same. This was available in old web browsers and browsers with special extensions.
- Another mode resizes all objects (text, images, boxes, embedded videos, etc.) and performs a layout shift / reflow such that the page still fits horizontally on the screen. In web browsers, this is available through Ctrl++ and Ctrl+mouse wheel.
- Visual viewport zoom resizes all objects without performing a reflow, i.e., the page does not fit horizontally on the screen and the user has to scroll left or right to see other objects. In web browsers, this is available through pinch gestures on a touchscreen or touchpad.

Due to having both a keyboard and a multi-touch touchpad, laptop computers support the latter two modes in many web browsers.

== User interface ==
Page zoom in LibreOffice Writer

The level of page zoom, expressed as a percentage, can often be accessed using a slider. Other methods include a drop-down menu from with a zoom level can be selected, pinch-to-zoom on touchscreen devices, mouse wheel scrolling (often in combination with holding down a key on the keyboard), or keyboard shortcuts (such as CTRL + +/-).

If the content becomes larger than the screen when zoomed in, a horizontal scroll bar may appear to allow the user to navigate.

== Zooming of non-text media ==
Image viewing applications allow the user to zoom in on an area of an image. Most home entertainment media players of recent generations such as DVD and Blu-ray also include the ability to zoom in and out via buttons on a remote control, and to change the area of focus of the zoom.

== See also ==
- Resolution independence, in which elements on a computer screen are rendered at sizes independent from the pixel grid
- Zooming user interface
