= HathiTrust =

Digital library

- Website type: Digital library
- Owner: University consortium
- Revenue: US$3,777,445 (2019 projections for proposal)
- Parent: University of Michigan
- Website: hathitrust.org
- Commercial: Partially
- Launched: October 2008; 18 years ago
- Current status: Active
- Content license: Public domain (with restrictions on Google scans), various
- Written in: Perl, Java

HathiTrust Digital Library is a large-scale collaborative repository of digital content from research libraries, administered by the University of Michigan. Its holdings include content digitized via Google Books and the Internet Archive digitization initiatives, as well as content digitized locally by libraries.

== Etymology ==
Hathi (/ˈhɑːti/), derived from the Sanskrit hastin, is the Hindi word for 'elephant', an animal famed for its long-term memory.

== History ==
HathiTrust was founded in October 2008 by the twelve universities of the Committee on Institutional Cooperation and the eleven libraries of the University of California. As of 2024, members include more than 219 research libraries across the United States, Canada, and Europe, and is based on a shared governance structure. Costs are shared by the participating libraries and library consortia. The repository is administered by the University of Michigan. The executive director of HathiTrust is Mike Furlough, who succeeded founding director John Wilkin after Wilkin stepped down in 2013. The HathiTrust Shared Print Program is a distributed collective collection whose participating libraries have committed to retaining almost 18 million monograph volumes for 25 years, representing three-quarters of HathiTrust digital book holdings.

In September 2011, the Authors Guild sued HathiTrust (Authors Guild, Inc. v. HathiTrust), alleging massive copyright violation. A federal court ruled against the Authors Guild in October 2012, finding that HathiTrust's use of books scanned by Google was fair use under US law. The court's opinion relied on the transformativeness doctrine of federal copyright law, holding that HathiTrust had transformed the copyrighted works without infringing on the copyright holders' rights. That decision was largely affirmed by the Second Circuit on June 10, 2014, which found that providing search and accessibility for the visually impaired were grounds to consider the service transformative and fair use, and remanded to the lower court to reconsider whether the plaintiffs had standing to sue regarding HathiTrust's library preservation copies.

In September 2024, HathiTrust comprised more than 18 million volumes, including 6.7 million in the public domain in the United States. HathiTrust provides a number of discovery and access services, notably, full-text search across the entire repository.

As of 2021, the copyright policy states that "many works in our collection are protected by copyright law, so we cannot ordinarily publicly display large portions of those protected works unless we have permission from the copyright holder", and thus "if we cannot determine the copyright or permission status of a work, we restrict access to that work until we can establish its status. Because of differences in international copyright laws, access is also restricted for users outside the United States to works published outside the United States after and including 1896."

== PageTurner ==
PageTurner is the web application on the HathiTrust website for viewing publications. From PageTurner readers can navigate through a publication, download a PDF version of it, and view pages in different ways, such as one page at a time, scrolling, flipping, or thumbnail views.

== Emergency Temporary Access Service ==
The Emergency Temporary Access Service (ETAS) is a service provided by HathiTrust that makes it possible in certain special situations, such as closure of a library for a public health emergency, for users of HathiTrust member libraries to obtain lawful access to copyright digital materials in place of the corresponding physical books held by the same library.

== See also ==
- JSTOR
