= Scrolling =

Sliding motion vertically or horizontally over display devices

Parallax scrolling

In computer displays, filmmaking, television production, video games and other kinetic displays, scrolling is sliding text, images or video across a monitor or display, vertically or horizontally. "Scrolling," as such, does not change the layout of the text or pictures but moves (pans or tilts) the user's view across what is apparently a larger image that is not wholly seen. A common television and movie special effect is to scroll credits, while leaving the background stationary. Scrolling may take place completely without user intervention (as in film credits) or, on an interactive device, be triggered by touchscreen or a keypress and continue without further intervention until a further user action, or be entirely controlled by input devices.

Scrolling may take place in discrete increments (perhaps one or a few lines of text at a time), or continuously (smooth scrolling). Frame rate is the speed at which an entire image is redisplayed. It is related to scrolling in that changes to text and image position can only happen as often as the image can be redisplayed. When frame rate is a limiting factor, one smooth scrolling technique is to blur images during movement that would otherwise appear to "jump".

== Computing ==
=== Implementation ===
Scrolling is often carried out on a computer by the CPU (software scrolling) or by a graphics processor. Some systems feature hardware scrolling, where an image may be offset as it is displayed, without any frame buffer manipulation (see also hardware windowing). This was especially common in 8 and 16bit video game consoles.

=== UI paradigms ===
In a WIMP-style graphical user interface (GUI), user-controlled scrolling is carried out by manipulating a scrollbar with a mouse, or using keyboard shortcuts, often the arrow keys. Scrolling is often supported by text user interfaces and command line interfaces. Older computer terminals changed the entire contents of the display one screenful ("page") at a time; this paging mode requires fewer resources than scrolling. Scrolling displays often also support page mode. Typically certain keys or key combinations page up or down; on PC-compatible keyboards the page up and page down keys or the space bar are used; earlier computers often used control key combinations. (Note: The widely used WordStar word processor used the "diamond" of Ctrl-S/E/D/X to move the cursor left, up, right, and down, and Ctrl-R and Ctrl-C to page up and down.) Some computer mice have a scroll wheel, which scrolls the display, often vertically, when rolled; others have scroll balls or tilt wheels which allow both vertical and horizontal scrolling.

Some software supports other ways of scrolling. Many document viewers, such as Okular or Adobe Reader, have a mode identified by a small hand icon ("hand tool") on the document, which can then be dragged by clicking on it and moving the mouse as if sliding a large sheet of paper. When this feature is implemented on a touchscreen it is called kinetic scrolling. Touch-screens often use inertial scrolling, in which the scrolling motion of an object continues in a decaying fashion after release of the touch, simulating the appearance of an object with inertia. An early implementation of such behavior was in the "Star7" PDA of Sun Microsystems ca. 1991–1992.

Scrolling can be controlled in other software-dependent ways by a PC mouse. Some scroll wheels can be pressed down, functioning like a button. Depending on the software, this allows both horizontal and vertical scrolling by dragging in the direction desired; when the mouse is moved to the original position, scrolling stops. A few scroll wheels can also be tilted, scrolling horizontally in one direction until released. On touchscreen devices, scrolling is a multi-touch gesture, done by swiping a finger on the screen vertically in the direction opposite to where the user wants to scroll to.

If any content is too wide to fit on a display, horizontal scrolling is required to view all of it. In applications such as graphics and spreadsheets there is often more content than can fit either the width or the height of the screen at a comfortable scale, and scrolling in both directions is necessary.

=== Infinite scrolling ===
In contrast to material divided into discrete pages, the web design approach of infinite scrolling dynamically adds new material to the user display, leading to a continuous, apparently bottomless or endless scrolling experience.

=== Text ===
In languages written horizontally, such as most Western languages, text documents longer than will fit on the screen are often displayed wrapped and sized to fit the screen width, and scrolled vertically to bring desired content into view. It is possible to display lines too long to fit the display without wrapping, scrolling horizontally to view each entire line. However, this requires inconvenient constant line-by-line scrolling, while vertical scrolling is only needed after reading a full screenful.

Software such as word processors and web browsers normally uses word-wrapping to display as many words in a single line as will fit the width of the screen or window or, for text organised in columns, each column.

=== Demos ===
Scrolling texts, also referred to as scrolltexts or scrollers, played an important part in the birth of the computer demo culture. The software crackers often used their deep knowledge of computer platforms to transform the information that accompanied their releases into crack intros. The sole role of these intros was to scroll the text on the screen in an impressive way.

== Film and television ==
Scrolling is commonly used to display the credits at the end of films and television programs.

Scrolling is often used in the form of a news ticker towards the bottom of the picture for content such as television news, scrolling sideways across the screen, delivering short-form content.

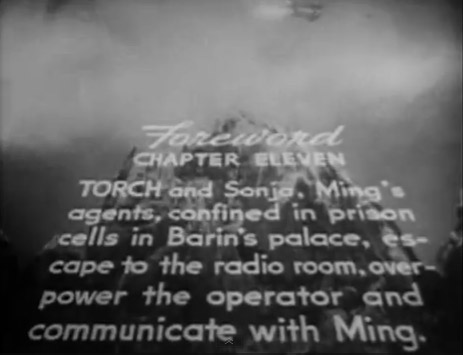
A frame of the opening crawl of episode 11 of Flash Gordon Conquers the Universe (1940)

In the dynamic layout of kinetic typography, scrolling typography can scroll across the flat screen, or can appear to recede or advance. An iconic example is the Star Wars opening crawl inspired by the Flash Gordon serials.

== Video games ==
In computer and video games, scrolling of a playing field allows the player to control an object in a large contiguous area. Early examples of this method include Taito's 1974 vertical-scrolling racing video game Speed Race, Sega's 1976 forward-scrolling racing games Moto-Cross (Fonz) and Road Race, and Super Bug. Previously the flip-screen method was used to indicate moving backgrounds.

The Namco Galaxian arcade system board introduced with Galaxian in 1979 pioneered a sprite system that animated pre-loaded sprites over a scrolling background, which became the basis for Nintendo's Radar Scope and Donkey Kong arcade hardware and home consoles such as the Nintendo Entertainment System.

Parallax scrolling, which was first featured in Moon Patrol, involves several semi-transparent layers (called playfields), which scroll on top of each other at varying rates in order to give an early pseudo-3D illusion of depth.

Belt scrolling is a method used in side-scrolling beat 'em up games with a downward camera angle where players can move up and down in addition to left and right.

== Studies ==
A 1993 article by George Fitzmaurice studied spatially aware palmtop computers. These devices had a 3D sensor, and moving the device caused the contents to move as if the contents were fixed in place. This interaction could be referred to as “moving to scroll.” Also, if the user moved the device away from their body, they would zoom in; conversely, the device would zoom out if the user pulled the device closer to them. Smartphone cameras and “optical flow” image analysis utilize this technique nowadays.

A 1996 research paper by Jun Rekimoto analyzed tilting operations as scrolling techniques on small screen interfaces. Users could not only tilt to scroll, but also tilt to select menu items. These techniques proved especially useful for field workers, since they only needed to hold and control the device with one hand.

A study from 2013 by Selina Sharmin, Oleg Špakov, and Kari-Jouko Räihä explored the action of reading text on a screen while the text auto-scrolls based on the user's eye tracking patterns. The control group simply read text on a screen and manually scrolled. The study found that participants preferred to read primarily at the top of the screen, so the screen scrolled down whenever participants’ eyes began to look toward the bottom of the screen. This auto-scrolling caused no statistically significant difference in reading speed or performance.

An undated study occurring during or after 2010 by Dede Frederick, James Mohler, Mihaela Vorvoreanu, and Ronald Glotzbach noted that parallax scrolling "may cause certain people to experience nausea."

== See also ==
- Flip page – an alternate visual effect for navigating digital publications
