= Peter Dankelson =

Motivational speaker and musician

Peter (Pete) Dankelson
- Born: Michigan
- Occupation: Guitarist
- Instrument: Guitar

Peter Dankelson (born 2000) is a guitar player, motivational speaker and author from Libertyville, Illinois. He was born with Goldenhar syndrome which comprises a number of birth defects including a severe facial deformity. He is co-owner of Pete's Diary LLC, which publishes, distributes, and manages his books and music. Pete's Diary is also the name of his band. MusicRadar named him one of "The 13 best online guitar personalities of 2020".

== Early life ==
Dankelson was born in Michigan in the year 2000. He was born ten weeks early and weighed less than three pounds. He was born with numerous birth defects such as microtia and atresia due to Goldenhar syndrome, and has had 36 surgeries to correct his facial, airway and other deformities. He was born without a left ear or left ear canal. At birth, he needed tracheostomy surgery.

When he was in high school he and his family moved to Libertyville, Illinois. In high school he had surgery to install a bone anchored hearing aid called the Baha 5 Sound Processor. He attended Libertyville High School.

He is a member of the Children's Craniofacial Association.

== Career ==
He is a musician and a motivational speaker. He operates a motivational website called Pete's Diary. On the Pete's Diary website Dankelson states that he began playing guitar when he was 15 years old. He claims to have 700,0000 social media followers. In December 2022 MusicRadar published an article titled "The 13 best online guitar personalities of 2020, as voted by you". They named Peter Dankelson (Pete's Diary) 3rd on their list.

Dankelson is the subject of two books. He co-wrote "How I Learned To Rock My Life: The Peter Dankelson Story". His mother and business partner Dede Dankelson wrote the book "Peter's Rockin' Ear: A Story of Self-Acceptance"

== See also ==
- Children's Craniofacial Association
