= Flip page =

A flip page effect is a software GUI effect that visually shows a representation of a newspaper, book or leaflet as virtual paper pages that appear to be turned manually through computer animation. It is an alternative to scrolling pages.

Flip page effects can be found in both online (web app) and offline application software, and are often created automatically from one of various e-book formats. For example, flip page effects can be found in the online digital libraries HathiTrust and Internet Archive, and in commercial reading apps such as Paperturn, 3D Issue and Issuu. An early implementation of the effect was the flipping page effect in Macromedia Flash applications in the late 1990s.

Some experimental studies have shown that many users prefer flip page interfaces for digital publications under certain conditions.

== See also ==
- Interaction techniques
- User interface design
