= Keyboard mnemonic =

Designated character in a GUI to jump directly to or activate a widget

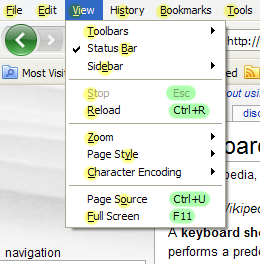
Firefox 3.0 menu with shortcuts highlighted with green and mnemonics highlighted with yellow.

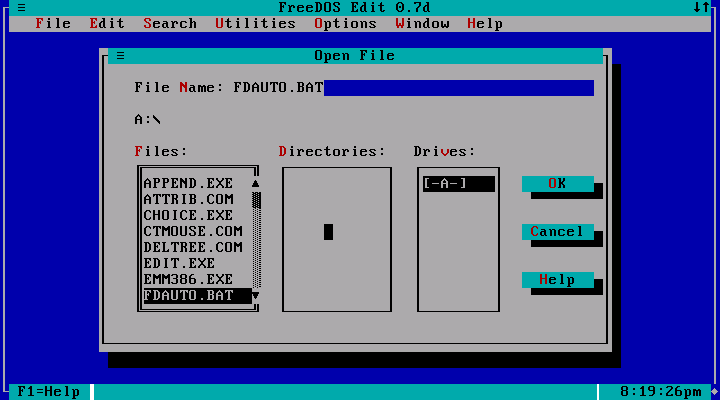
The FreeDOS text editor, a typical early implementation as used for purely text-based user interfaces (with Box-drawing characters)

Keyboard mnemonics belong to a widely implemented assistive interaction technique of text-based and graphical user interfaces where a single alphanumerical character within the label of each control element out of a group of options, like menu titles, menu items and buttons, is highlighted to indicate a corresponding, both, easily recognizable as well as memorable explicit keyboard-based interface for quicker navigation and command selection, especially when memorized.

In contrast to external and rather arbitrarily assignable keyboard shortcuts, here, "mnemonics" refer to the usage of highlighting (often by underlining) as a visual communication method, namely each of a part of the respective textual representation itself. Whereas the eventually denoted character derives from its rather visual ability to clearly indicate which unique key to press (commonly in conjunction with the Alt key) to trigger a designated operation or navigate to a specific component directly; thus rather than via an enumerated mapping of the available items or a spatial navigation using the arrow keys.

In Microsoft Windows, mnemonics are called "Access keys". In Web browsers, Access keys may or may not be engaged by the Alt key.

Using mnemonics is limited to entering the underlined character with a single key stroke; for this reason, localized versions of software omit letters with diacritics that need to be input via an extra dead key stroke.

== See also ==
- Keyboard shortcut
- Opcode mnemonics in Assembly language
