= Whitewater Group =

American software company, 1988–1992

- Type: Private (1988–1992)
- Industry: Software, object-oriented programming tools
- Founded: 1988; 38 years ago in Evanston, Illinois, United States
- Defunct: 1992
- Fate: Acquired by Symantec, 1992
- Headquarters: Evanston, Illinois, United States
- Products: Whitewater Resource Editor, Actor, OWL 1.0
- Parent: Symantec (1992)

Whitewater Group was an object-oriented software company based in Evanston, Illinois, founded in 1988. The company specialised in development tools for Microsoft Windows and contributed several significant early Windows programming technologies, including the Actor language, the Whitewater Resource Editor and the original Object Windows Library (OWL) framework. Symantec acquired Whitewater Group on 9 June 1992 for US$3.28 million.

== Products ==
- Whitewater Resource Editor — a visual editor for Windows resources such as dialog boxes, menus and icons, aimed at Windows application developers. It was licensed to Borland, which later replaced it with Resource Workshop.
- Actor — a Smalltalk-inspired object-oriented programming language for Windows, providing an interactive development environment and garbage-collected runtime at a time when most Windows development was done in C.
- OWL 1.0 — the original version of Borland's Object Windows Library, a C++ application framework for Windows programming, was designed and implemented by Whitewater Group under contract for Borland C++.
- Object-oriented design services — the company also operated a consulting division providing object-oriented design services.
