= Actor (programming language) =

Programming language

The Actor programming language was invented by Charles Duff of The Whitewater Group in 1988. It was an offshoot of some object-oriented extensions to the Forth language he had been working on.

Actor is a pure object-oriented language in the style of Smalltalk. Like Smalltalk, everything is an object, including small integers. A Baker semi-space garbage collector is used, along with (in memory-constrained Windows 2.1 days) a software virtual memory system that swaps objects. A token threaded interpreter, written in 16-bit x86 assembly language, executes compiled code.

Actor only was released for Microsoft Windows 2.1 and 3.0. Actor used a pure object-oriented framework over native operating system calls as its basic GUI architecture. This allows an Actor application to look and feel exactly like a Windows application written in C, but with all the advantages of an interactive Smalltalk-like development environment. Both a downside and upside to this architecture is a tight coupling to the Windows architecture, with a thin abstraction layer into objects. This allows direct use of the rich Windows OS API, but also makes it nearly impossible to support any other OS without a significant rewrite of the application framework.

A demo of Actor was shown in an episode of Computer Chronicles.
