= Control-X =

Computer command

In computing, Control-X or ^X is the key combination of the control key and a key usually labelled "X", typically used to cut selected text and save it to the clipboard ready to paste elsewhere. There is some disagreement whether the action moves with the key labelled "X" or stays in the lower-left location on keyboards with different letter arrangements.

== Text editing ==
In many software applications on Windows and the X Window System Control+x can be used to cut highlighted mutable text to the clipboard. On Mac OS X ⌘ Command+x has an analogous function. This operation was one of a handful chosen by the program designers at Xerox PARC to control text editing. This style of human–computer interaction is referred to as indirect manipulation as opposed to direct manipulation. Direct manipulation is a term introduced by Ben Shneiderman in 1982 within the context of office applications and the desktop metaphor. Indirect manipulation has a higher level of abstraction compared to direct manipulation, because first one must select the item (such as character, word, paragraph or icon) that one wants to edit and then give the command as a second step.

On ASCII terminals the key combination produces the CAN control character. Before the standard use for "cut" it was used for a variety of different purposes by different software. Emacs uses it as the first keystroke in a number of two-keystroke commands, for instance Ctrl+XS saves the current file.

== See also ==
- Control-C
- Control-V
- Control-Z
- Keyboard shortcut
