= LANC =

LANC (Logic Application Control Bus System or Local Application Control Bus System), also known as Control-L, is a hardware and software communication protocol invented by Sony that synchronizes cameras.

The LANC terminal on Sony and other manufacturers' camcorders lets accessories, such as tripods with a control handle, control the camera over a cable connected to the LANC port instead of using buttons on the camera. It is also available on many still cameras, where it is called ACC (the Sony DSC-xxxx series of cameras).

The bi-directional protocol is made up of 8 (8-bit) bytes, usually clocked by the camera at 9600 bit/s. Each frame of bytes occurs in sync with the beginning of each video frame (NTSC or PAL). The physical connector is either a 5-pin mini-DIN connector and jack or a 2.5mm 3-conductor phone jack and plug (TRS connector).

In newer Sony digital Handycam camcorders with 10-pin multi-A/V remote terminal jacks, LANC is available, but not directly accessible without making a home-made adapter cable or a pre-made cable by Sony Part# J-6082-535-A. Sony RM-AV2 Remote Commander is an example of a LANC controller that plugs into the Sony 10-pin multi-A/V remote terminal jack.

Starting with the 2015 model year, Sony has switched to a special 15 pin multiport connector that looks similar to a USB connector. However, it has 15 pins inside the connector, where a USB connection has 5. Currently, only the Sony VPR-RM1 controller works with Sony camcorders from 2015 and newer.

Sony "Control-S" is a similar interface, but is uni-directional, providing control-only, and not feedback from the controlled device.

Panasonic Control-M is a similar 5-pin mini-DIN bi-directional interface and protocol with a different implementation.

== See also ==
- Joint Level Interface Protocol
