= Control-C =

Computer command

Control-C is a common computer command. It is generated by holding down the Ctrl key and typing the C key.

In graphical user interface environments, control+C is often used to copy highlighted text to the clipboard. Macintosh computers use ⌘ Command+C for this.

In many command-line interface environments, control+C is used to abort the current task and regain user control.

== In graphical environments ==
Larry Tesler created the concept of cut, copy, paste, and undo for human-computer interaction while working at Xerox PARC to control text editing. During the development of the Macintosh it was decided that the cut, paste, copy and undo would be used frequently and assigned them to the ⌘-Z (Undo), ⌘-X (Cut), ⌘-C (Copy), and ⌘-V (Paste). The four letters are all located together at the left end of the bottom row of the standard QWERTY keyboard. IBM and early versions of Windows used a different set of keys as part of IBM Common User Access. Later, Windows adopted the shortcuts using Control instead of the Command key, as the usual keyboard of IBM PC has no Command key.

== In command-line environments ==
Control+C was part of various Digital Equipment operating systems, including TOPS-10 and TOPS-20. Its popularity as an abort command was adopted by other systems including Unix. Later systems that copied it include CP/M, DOS and Windows. In POSIX systems, the sequence causes the active program to receive SIGINT, the interruption signal. If the program does not specify how to handle this condition, the program is terminated. Typically a program that does handle a SIGINT will still terminate itself, or at least terminate a task running inside it.

This system is usually preserved even in graphical terminal emulators. If control-C is used for copy in the graphical environment, an ambiguity arises. Typically ⇧ Shift+Ctrl+C is used for one of the commands, and both appear in the emulator's menus.

On ASCII terminals the keystroke produced the end-of-text control character. There is no indication this had anything to do with the choice to use it to interrupt programs, instead it was chosen because it was not being used for anything else.

== See also ==
- C0 and C1 control codes
- Control-D
- Control-V
- Control-X
- Control-Z
- Control-\
- Keyboard shortcut
