= Control key =

Key on computer keyboards

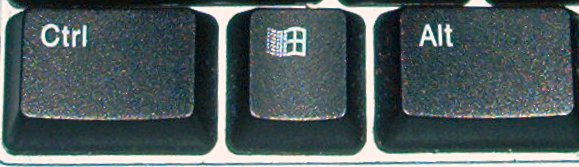
A Control key (marked "Ctrl") on a Windows keyboard next to one style of a Windows key, followed in turn by an Alt key

The rarely used ISO keyboard symbol for "Control"

In computing, a Control key Ctrl is a modifier key which, when pressed in conjunction with another key, performs a special operation (for example, Ctrl+C). Similarly to the Shift key, the Control key rarely performs any function when pressed by itself. The Control key is located on or near the bottom left side of most keyboards (in accordance with the international standard ISO/IEC 9995-2), with many featuring an additional one at the bottom right.

On keyboards that use English abbreviations for key labeling, it is usually labeled Ctrl (Control or Ctl are sometimes used, but it is uncommon). Abbreviations in the language of the keyboard layout also are in use, e.g., the German keyboard layout uses Strg (Steuerung) as required by the German standard DIN 2137:2012-06. There is a standardized keyboard symbol (to be used when Latin lettering is not preferred). (Note: given in ISO/IEC 9995-7 as symbol 26, and in ISO 7000 "Graphical symbols for use on equipment" as symbol ISO-7000-2028) This symbol is encoded in Unicode as U+2388 helm symbol ⎈, but it is very rarely used.

== History ==
On teletypewriters and computer terminals, holding down the Control key while pressing another key would send an ASCII C0 control character, instead of directly reporting a key press to the system. The control characters were used as non-printing characters that signal the terminal or teletypewriter to perform a special action, such as ringing a bell, ejecting a page or erasing the screen, or controlling where the next character will display.

The first 32 ASCII characters are the control characters, representable by a 5-bit binary number. Because ASCII characters were represented as 7 bits, if a key is pressed while the Control key was held down, teletypewriters and terminals would simply set the first 2 bits of a character to 0, converting the character into a control character. For example, the character a has a binary ASCII code of 110 0001. This code would be converted to 000 0001, corresponding to the ASCII character with id 1 (the SOH Character). The table at C0 and C1 control codes § C0 controls shows the ASCII control characters, with the "Caret notation" column showing a caret (^), followed by the character to press while the Control key is held down to generate the character.

If a teletypewriter or terminal is connected to a computer, the software on the computer can interpret control characters it receives however it is written to do so; a given control character can be interpreted differently from how it would be interpreted by a teletypewriter or terminal that receives it. For example, Control-C, received from a teletypewriter or terminal, is interpreted as "interrupt the current program" in some command-line interfaces, and Control-E is interpreted by the Emacs text editor as "move the editor cursor to the end of the line".

Computer keyboards directly attached to a computer, as is the case for a personal computer or workstation, distinguish each physical key from every other and report all keypresses and releases to the controlling software. This allows the software to interpret Control key combinations as it chooses, including being able to interpret a combination of the Control key, another modifier key, and a letter, number, or symbol key differently from the way it interprets a combination of the Control key and the letter, number, or symbol key without that other modifier key.

== Location ==
The keyboards of many early computer terminals, including the Teletype Model 33 ASR and Lear-Siegler ADM-3A, and early models of the IBM PC, positioned the Control key on the left of the keyboard, whereas caps lock resides in the same position on most modern keyboards. The traditional layout was preserved for later workstation systems and is often associated with Unix workstations. Keyboards from Sun Microsystems came in two layouts; "Unix" and "PC-style", with the Unix layout having the traditional placing of the Control key and other keys. The keyboards produced for One Laptop Per Child computers also have the Control key in this location. Other vendors produce keyboards for different computer systems with this placement of the Control key, such as the Happy Hacking Keyboard.

Some users of keyboards with caps lock on the left remap the keys to exchange Control and caps lock, finding the traditional location more ergonomic for using programs benefiting from use of the Control key. Keyboard layout preferences specifically to address this need are available in some operating systems.

Others leave the control key in the lower-left corner of the keyboard, and press it using the side of their palm. The choice of location for the control key often comes down to the typist's hand shape and posture.

== Notation ==
There are several common notations for pressing the Control key in conjunction with another key. Each notation below means press and hold Ctrl while pressing the X key:

^X	Traditional caret notation
C-x	Emacs and Vim notation
CTRL-X	Old Microsoft notation
Ctrl+X	Current Microsoft notation
Ctrl/X	OpenVMS notation
⌃X	Classic Mac OS and macOS notation, used in menus and Sticky Keys (similar to caret notation, but using U+2303 ⌃ UP ARROWHEAD instead of a caret)
Control–X	Classic Mac OS and macOS notation, used in prose
CNTL/X	Cisco IOS notation
|X	Bar notation

== Table of examples ==
Different application programs, user interfaces, and operating systems use the various control key combinations for different purposes.

Key combination	Microsoft Windows/KDE/GNOME	Unix (command line and programs using readline)	Emacs (if different from Unix command line)
Ctrl+A	Select all	Beginning of line	
Ctrl+B	Bold	Backward one character	
Ctrl+C	Copy	Generate SIGINT (terminate program)	Compound command
Ctrl+D	Font window (word processing); Add to bookmarks (Browsers)	Forward delete, or if line is empty, end of input (traditional Unix)	Forward delete
Ctrl+E	Center alignment (word processing)	End of line	
Ctrl+F	Find (usually a small piece of text in a larger document)	Forward one character	
Ctrl+G	Go to (line number); Finds the next occurrence of a previously searched term (Browsers)	Abort current operation	
Ctrl+H	Replace; History	Delete previous character	Help key
Ctrl+I	Italic; Incremental search	Command-line completion (same as Tab key)	
Ctrl+J	Justify; Downloads	Line feed (LFD)	LFD (to evaluate Lisp expressions)
Ctrl+K	Insert hyperlink (word processing)	Cut ("Kill") text between cursor and end of line	
Ctrl+L	Create list; Left align (word processing)	Clear screen	Redraw window/terminal, and recenter view around current line
Ctrl+M	Increase margin by 1/2 inch (word processing)	Same as Enter key	
Ctrl+N	New (window, document, etc.)	Next line (in history)	Next line
Ctrl+O	Open	Enter plus next line (in history)	Insert ("open") new line
Ctrl+P	Print current page	Previous line (in history)	Previous line
Ctrl+Q	Quit application	Resume transmission	Literal insert
Ctrl+R	Refresh page; Right align (word processing)	Search backwards in history	Search backwards
Ctrl+S	Save	Pause transmission	Search forward
Ctrl+T	Open new tab	Transpose characters, display status	
Ctrl+U	Underline; HTML of page you are currently looking at	Cut text between beginning of line and cursor	Prefix numerical argument to next command
Ctrl+V	Paste	Literal insert	Page down
Ctrl+W	Close window or tab	Cut previous word	Cut
Ctrl+X	Cut	Compound command	
Ctrl+Y	Redo	Paste	
Ctrl+Z	Undo	Suspend program	Iconify window
Ctrl+⇧ Shift+Z	Redo	not available	
Ctrl+[	Decrease font size	Same as Esc or Alt	
Ctrl+]	Increase font size	Search for the next character typed	undefined or rarely used
Ctrl+=	Toggle font subscript	not available	
Ctrl+⇧ Shift+=	Toggle font superscript	not available	
Ctrl+End	Bottom (end of document or window)	undefined or rarely used	Bottom (end of text buffer)
Ctrl+Home	Top (start of document or window)	undefined or rarely used	Top (start of text buffer)
Ctrl+Insert	Copy	undefined or rarely used	Copy
Ctrl+PgDn	Next tab	undefined or rarely used	Scroll window to the right
Ctrl+PgUp	Previous tab	undefined or rarely used	Scroll window to the left
Ctrl+Tab ↹	Next window or tab	not available	
Ctrl+⇧ Shift+Tab ↹	Previous window or tab	not available	
Ctrl++	Zoom in on window	not available	
Ctrl+-	Zoom out on window	Undo	
Ctrl+0	Restore window to default zoom factor	not available	
Ctrl+/	undefined or rarely used	Same as Ctrl+- (Undo)	
Ctrl+\	undefined or rarely used	Generate SIGQUIT (terminate and dump core)	undefined or rarely used
Ctrl+←	Previous word	undefined or rarely used	Previous word
Ctrl+→	Next word	undefined or rarely used	Next word
Ctrl+Del	Delete next word	undefined or rarely used	Delete next word
Ctrl+← Backspace	Delete previous word	undefined or rarely used	Delete previous word
Ctrl+Alt+← Backspace	undefined or rarely used on Windows; restart X11 on Unix-like desktops	undefined or rarely used	
Ctrl+Alt+↑	Rotate screen right-side up	undefined or rarely used	
Ctrl+Alt+↓	Rotate screen upside down	undefined or rarely used	
Ctrl+Alt+←	Rotate screen left	undefined or rarely used	
Ctrl+Alt+→	Rotate screen right	undefined or rarely used	
Ctrl+⇧ Shift+Esc	Open task manager	not available	
Ctrl+Alt+Del	Reboot; Open task manager or session options	not available	
Ctrl+Mousewheel	Zoom in/out		

In early first-person shooters, the left Ctrl key is often used to fire a weapon. In newer games, the key is often used for crouching instead.

== Similar concepts ==
Generally, the Command key, labeled with the ⌘ symbol on Apple Macintosh computers, performs the equivalent functions in classic Mac OS and macOS applications (for example, ⌘C copies, while ⌘P prints; the same holds for saving, cutting, and pasting).

Mac computers also have a Control key, but it has different functionality. The original Apple mouse design reduced complexity by only offering one button. As the interface developed, contextual menus were offered to access extra options. Another button was needed to access these. On Unix and Windows, the user had other mouse buttons to use. On Classic Mac OS and macOS, the Control key is used to invoke a "right-click". Apple calls this a "secondary click" as left-handers can choose which side this button is on.

- It is mostly used as a modifier key for key-combinations.
- Pressing Control and clicking the mouse button will invoke a contextual menu. This is a compatibility feature for users with one-button mice; users with two-button mice just use the right mouse-button, with no modifiers.
- It is used in the command line interface with programs made for that interface.
- In Quickbooks, the Control Key is used to validate login credentials during OLSU 1016 and OLSU 1013 errors. Keeping it depressed while sending information to the Quickbooks servers fixes the errors.
- Under macOS, the Control key allows the use of Emacs-style key combinations in most text entry fields. For example, Ctrl-A moves the caret to the start of the paragraph, Ctrl-L vertically centers the current line in the editing field, Ctrl-K cuts text to the end of the line to a kill ring separate from the normal clipboard, etc.

== See also ==
- Alt key
- Break key
- Control characters
- Control-Alt-Delete
- Function key
- Keyboard layout
- Modifier key
- IBM Common User Access

IBM PC keyboard (Windows, ANSI US layout)
Esc

F1
F2
F3
F4

F5
F6
F7
F8

F9
F10
F11
F12

PrtSc/
SysRq
Scroll
Lock
Pause/
Break

Insert
Home
Page
Up

Num
Lock
∕
∗
−
Delete
End
Page
Down
7
8
9
+

4
5
6

↑

1
2
3
Enter
←
↓
→
0
Ins
.
Del
