= File menu =

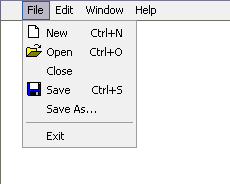
A generic file menu

The File menu is a graphical control element formerly common to most file-handling computer programs, but more recently often replaced by a toolbar or ribbon. It often appears as the first item in the menu bar, and contains commands relating to the handling of files, such as open, save, print, etc. It may also contain a list of recently edited files.

In some operating systems, the file menu also offers commands for closing windows and exiting the current program.
