= Control-V =

Computer command

In computing, Control-V is a key stroke with a variety of uses including generation of a control character in ASCII code, also known as the synchronous idle (SYN) character. The key stroke is generated by typing Ctrl+V. On MacOS based systems usually ⌘ Cmd+V is used instead.

== Usage ==
In many GUI environments, including Microsoft Windows and most desktop environments based on the X Window System, and in applications such as word processing software running in those environments, control-V can be used to paste text or other content (if supported) from the clipboard at the current cursor position. Control-V was one of a handful of keyboard sequences chosen by the program designers at Xerox PARC to control text editing.

Unix interactive terminals use Control-V to mean "the next character should be treated literally" (the mnemonic here is "V for verbatim"). This allows a user to insert a literal Control-C or Control-H or similar control characters that would otherwise be handled by the terminal. This behavior was copied by text editors like vi and Unix shells like bash and tcsh, which offer text editing on the command line.

== Representation ==
The ASCII and Unicode representation of "Synchronous Idle" is 22 in decimal, which is 26 in octal and 16 in hexadecimal.

== See also ==
- Control-C
- Control-X
- Keyboard shortcut
