= Cornerstone Christian School (Albion, Indiana) =

Location
- 4304 South Oak Street; Albion, Noble County, Indiana 46701; United States
- Coordinates: 41.289932°N 85.436645°W

Information
- Type: Private Christian
- Principal: George Cecil
- Faculty: 5
- Grades: K-12
- Enrollment: 60 (2013-2014)
- Affiliation: Christianity / Wesleyanism
- Website: Official Website

Cornerstone Christian School is a private Christian school located in Albion, Indiana.

== See also ==
- List of high schools in Indiana
