= Chartered Cost Accountant =

Professional designation

Chartered Cost Accountant (CCA) is a cost accounting or cost control professional designation offered by the American Academy of Financial Management. The CCA is a Graduate from Post Nominal (GPN) that is only available for accountants with an accredited degree, MBA, CPA, Chartered Accountant License, law degree, PhD or specialized executive training.

== See also ==
- Accountant

== External Board of Standards Links ==
- AAPM Amer. Academy of Financial Management
