= Joint Level Interface Protocol =

Video equipment control data standard

The Joint Level Interface Protocol (JLIP) is a video equipment control data standard.

JLIP was JVC's answer to the Sony Control L or LANC two-way serial bus. It is used to allow devices communicate with other, carrying control signals and exchanging data. JLIP jacks are now fitted to all new JVC camcorders, some older models, some VCRs and peripheral devices, like their new video printer.
