= Children's Craniofacial Association =

US-based nonprofit organization

The Children's Craniofacial Association (CCA) is a United States–based nonprofit organization supporting individuals and families with facial disfigurements. CCA is a family support organization recognized by governmental, educational and medical healthcare agencies across the US.

== Children's Craniofacial Association's National Spokesperson is actor, entertainer Cher ==
Cher became CCA's National Spokesperson in 1990. In 1985, Cher starred in the movie Mask, a film about the life of Rocky Dennis, who had a rare craniofacial condition called Craniodiaphyseal Dysplasia. Cher attended an event in Washington, DC in September 1990, where families affected by craniofacial conditions testified before the House Budget Committee. During that week, she joined ten families on a visit to the White House hosted by then, First Lady, Barbara Bush. During her Love Hurts, Believe and Farewell Tours, Cher often invited children with craniofacial conditions back stage to visit.

=== Publications ===
==== Quarterly Newsletter ====
CCA publishes a quarterly newsletter containing articles written by craniofacial surgeons, healthcare providers, family members and others.

== See also ==
- Goldenhar syndrome
- Peter Dankelson
