= Callout =

Text connected by a line to a feature of an image

In publishing, a callout or call-out is a short string of text connected by a line, arrow, or similar graphic to a feature of an illustration or technical drawing and giving information about that feature. The term is also used to describe a short piece of text set in larger type than the rest of the page and intended to attract attention. In documents that require translation, a neutral callout is often used. By using numbers or letters as callouts in combination with an image caption, translation becomes more efficient, as the same graphic can be used in all languages.

A similar device in word processing is a special text box with or without a small "tail" that can be pointed to different locations on a document.

In the utility industry, a callout is an instruction to report for emergency or special work at an unusual time or place.

== Gallery ==
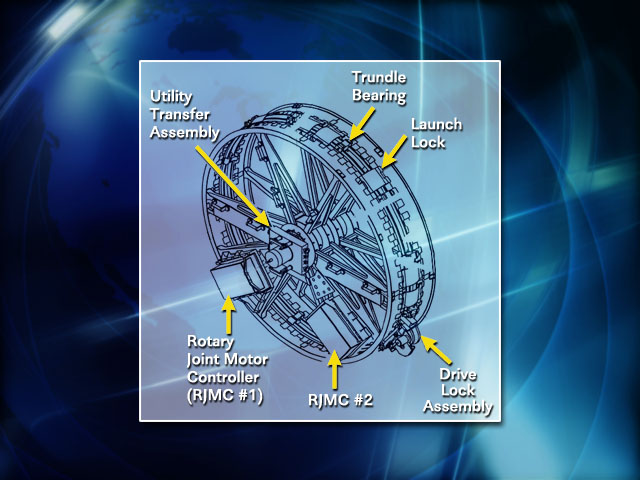
The callouts in this illustration give information about a solar array rotary joint of the International Space Station.

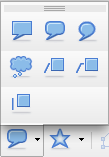
Description callout panel in NeoOffice Writer's draw toolbar.

Callout using numbers for efficient translation.

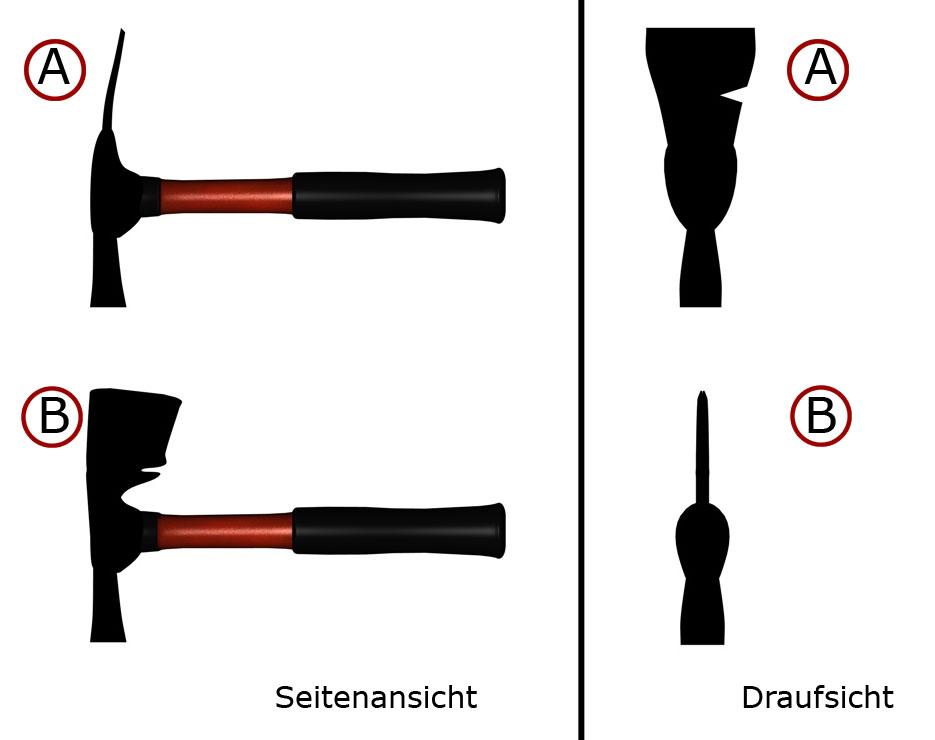
Callout using letters for distinction.

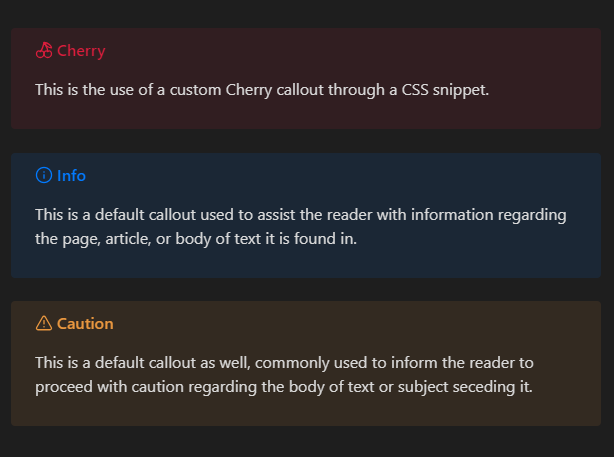
"Callout" boxes in the note-taking application Obsidian.

== Arts ==
In music, call-out hooks are small portions of a song, usually seven to ten seconds of a song's hook used by radio stations "in market research to assist in gauging the popularity of a song by the recognizability of its hook"

== See also ==
- Call-out culture
- Pull-quote
- Speech balloon
