= Cut, copy, and paste =

Computer user interface method

Cut, copy, and paste icons in ERP5.

Cut, copy, and paste are essential commands of modern human–computer interaction and user interface design. They offer an interprocess communication technique for transferring data through a computer's user interface. The cut command removes the selected data from its original position, and the copy command creates a duplicate; in both cases the selected data is kept in temporary storage called the clipboard. Clipboard data is later inserted wherever a paste command is issued. The data remains available to any application supporting the feature, thus allowing easy data transfer between applications.

The command names are a (skeuomorphic) interface metaphor based on the physical procedure used in manuscript print editing to create a page layout, like with paper. The commands were pioneered into computing by Xerox PARC in 1974, popularized by Apple Computer in the 1983 Lisa workstation and the 1984 Macintosh computer, and in a few home computer applications such as the 1984 word processor Cut & Paste.

This interaction technique has close associations with related techniques in graphical user interfaces (GUIs) that use pointing devices such as a computer mouse (by drag and drop, for example). Typically, clipboard support is provided by an operating system as part of its GUI and widget toolkit.

The capability to replicate information with ease, changing it between contexts and applications, involves privacy concerns because of the risks of disclosure when handling sensitive information. Terms like cloning, copy forward, carry forward, or re-use refer to the dissemination of such information through documents, and may be subject to regulation by administrative bodies.

== History ==
=== Origins ===
The term "cut and paste" comes from the traditional practice in manuscript editing, whereby people cut paragraphs from a page with scissors and paste them onto another page. This practice remained standard into the 1980s. Stationery stores sold "editing scissors" with blades long enough to cut an 8 1/2-inch-wide (220 mm) page. The advent of photocopiers made the practice easier and more flexible.

The act of copying or transferring text from one part of a computer-based document ("buffer") to a different location within the same or different computer-based document was a part of the earliest on-line computer editors. As soon as computer data entry moved from punch-cards to online files (in the mid/late 1960s) there were "commands" for accomplishing this operation. This mechanism was often used to transfer frequently-used commands or text snippets from additional buffers into the document, as was the case with the QED text editor.

=== Early methods ===
The earliest editors (designed for teleprinter terminals) provided keyboard commands to delineate a contiguous region of text, then delete or move it. Since moving a region of text requires first removing it from its initial location and then inserting it into its new location, various schemes had to be invented to allow for this multi-step process to be specified by the user. Often this was done with a "move" command, but some text editors required that the text be first put into some temporary location for later retrieval/placement. In 1983, the Apple Lisa became the first text editing system to call that temporary location "the clipboard".

Earlier control schemes such as NLS used a verb—object command structure, where the command name was provided first and the object to be copied or moved was second. The inversion from verb—object to object—verb on which copy and paste are based, where the user selects the object to be operated before initiating the operation, was an innovation crucial for the success of the desktop metaphor as it allowed copy and move operations based on direct manipulation.

=== Popularization ===
Inspired by early line and character editors, such as Pentti Kanerva's TV-Edit, that broke a move or copy operation into two steps—between which the user could invoke a preparatory action such as navigation—Lawrence G. "Larry" Tesler proposed the names "cut" and "copy" for the first step and "paste" for the second step. Beginning in 1974, he and colleagues at Xerox PARC implemented several text editors that used cut/copy-and-paste commands to move and copy text.

Apple Computer popularized this paradigm with its Lisa (1983) and Macintosh (1984) operating systems and applications. The functions were mapped to key combinations using the ⌘ Command key as a special modifier, which is held down while also pressing X for cut, C for copy, or V for paste. These few keyboard shortcuts allow the user to perform all the basic editing operations, and the keys are clustered at the left end of the bottom row of the standard QWERTY keyboard.

These are the standard shortcuts:

- Control-Z (or ⌘ Command+Z) to undo
- Control-X (or ⌘ Command+X) to cut
- Control-C (or ⌘ Command+C) to copy
- Control-V (or ⌘ Command+V) to paste

The IBM Common User Access (CUA) standard also uses combinations of the Insert, Del, Shift and Control keys. Early versions of Windows used the IBM standard. Microsoft later also adopted the Apple key combinations with the introduction of Windows, using the control key as modifier key.

Similar patterns of key combinations, later borrowed by others, are widely available in most GUI applications.

The original cut, copy, and paste workflow, as implemented at PARC, utilizes a unique workflow: With two windows on the same screen, the user could use the mouse to pick a point at which to make an insertion in one window (or a segment of text to replace). Then, by holding shift and selecting the copy source elsewhere on the same screen, the copy would be made as soon as the shift was released. Similarly, holding shift and control would copy and cut (delete) the source. This workflow requires many fewer keystrokes/mouse clicks than the current multi-step workflows, and did not require an explicit copy buffer. It was dropped, one presumes, because the original Apple and IBM GUIs were not high enough density to permit multiple windows, as were the PARC machines, and so multiple simultaneous windows were rarely used.

== Cut and paste ==
The sequence diagram of cut and paste operation

Computer-based editing can involve very frequent use of cut-and-paste operations. Most software-suppliers provide several methods for performing such tasks, and this can involve (for example) key combinations, pulldown menus, pop-up menus, or toolbar buttons.

1. The user selects or "highlights" the text or file for moving by some method, typically by dragging over the text or file name with the pointing-device or holding down the Shift key while using the arrow keys to move the text cursor.
2. The user performs a "cut" operation via key combination Ctrl+x (⌘+x for Macintosh users), menu, or other means.
3. Visibly, "cut" text immediately disappears from its location. "Cut" files typically change color to indicate that they will be moved.
4. Conceptually, the text has now moved to a location often called the clipboard. The clipboard typically remains invisible. On most systems only one clipboard location exists, hence another cut or copy operation overwrites the previously stored information. Many UNIX text-editors provide multiple clipboard entries, as do some Macintosh programs such as Clipboard Master, and Windows clipboard-manager programs such as the one in Microsoft Office.
5. The user selects a location for insertion by some method, typically by clicking at the desired insertion point.
6. A paste operation takes place which visibly inserts the clipboard text at the insertion point. (The paste operation does not typically destroy the clipboard text: it remains available in the clipboard and the user can insert additional copies at other points).

Whereas cut-and-paste often takes place with a mouse-equivalent in Windows-like GUI environments, it may also occur entirely from the keyboard, especially in UNIX text editors, such as Pico or vi. Cutting and pasting without a mouse can involve a selection (for which Ctrl+x is pressed in most graphical systems) or the entire current line, but it may also involve text after the cursor until the end of the line and other more sophisticated operations.

The clipboard usually stays invisible, because the operations of cutting and pasting, while actually independent, usually take place in quick succession, and the user (usually) needs no assistance in understanding the operation or maintaining mental context. Some application programs provide a means of viewing, or sometimes even editing, the data on the clipboard.

== Copy and paste ==
Sequence diagram of the copy-paste operation

The term "copy-and-paste" refers to the popular, simple method of reproducing text or other data from a source to a destination. It differs from cut and paste in that the original source text or data does not get deleted or removed. The popularity of this method stems from its simplicity and the ease with which users can move data between various applications visually – without resorting to permanent storage.

Use in healthcare documentation and electronic health records are sensitive, with potential for the introduction of medical errors, information overload, and fraud.

== See also ==
- Clipboard
- Control key
- Copypasta
- Creepypasta
- Copy-and-paste programming
- Copy Cursor
- Drag and drop
- Photomontage
- Publishing Interchange Language
- Simultaneous editing
- X Window selection
- Transposable element — Cut, copy, and paste in the genome.
