= Common Component Architecture =

The Common Component Architecture (CCA) was a standard for Component-based software engineering used in high-performance scientific computing. Features of the Common Component Architecture that distinguish it from commercial component standards Component Object Model, CORBA, Enterprise JavaBeans include support for Fortran programmers, multi-dimensional data arrays, exotic hardware and operating systems, and a variety of network data transports not typically suited for wide area networks.

== The Common Component Architecture Forum ==
Established in 1997, the Common Component Architecture Forum is a group of researchers defining the interface standards of CCA, as well as ensuring a smooth adoption of CCA tools and technologies.

Adoption of CCA appears to have been ceased, with CBA more widely used. The latest forum news released in November 2006.
