= Atex (software) =

Swedish software company

- Type: Privately held company
- Industry: Software
- Founded: 1973; 53 years ago in Massachusetts
- Founders: Douglas Drane, Charles and Richard Ying
- Headquarters: Stockholm, Sweden
- Area served: Worldwide
- Products: Advertising, editorial and web content management systems, ad management systems, print automation
- Owner: Aquila (Constellation Software)
- Number of employees: 330 (2024)
- Website: www.atex.com

Atex is a Swedish-British company specializing in the development of advertising, editorial and web content management systems.

The company was established in Massachusetts in 1973 and grew to become a worldwide hardware and software supplier to the news publishing industry. It participated in much of the change in the print industry involving the move from hot-metal through photo and then laser typesetting, culminating in computer to plate (CTP). The company expanded to include web publishing as an integral part of its product line.

The company claims to have over US$1 billion worth of software installed worldwide, and claims more than 1000 customers in 55 countries. The company is based in Sweden and the UK, with an international leadership group that distributed through Sweden, United Kingdom, United States and Australia. It has been owned by Aquila, a Canadian Constellation Software company since 2017.

== History ==
=== 1970s ===
Atex was founded in Massachusetts in 1973 by Douglas Drane and Charles and Richard Ying, graduates of MIT, who had an idea for a new type of electronic composition system. By 1974 they had created a prototype video display terminal, encased in a cardboard whiskey carton. The weekly news magazine U.S. News & World Report was their first customer and an early investor.

By 1977, Atex had successfully connected reporters and editors via a paper-free system that allowed working on-screen instead of on typewriters. The system had a terminal-and-server paradigm, using modified DEC PDP-11 minicomputer hardware running a custom Atex multi-user operating system. Terminals were little more than keyboards, with the servers directly generating video signals for each terminal. The memory-mapped screen images were monochrome and not high resolution, but they could scroll quickly and fluidly without the constraints imposed by conventional serial data connections, which at the time were not very fast. The servers were paired for redundancy; each story saved to disk was written to two separate systems. The systems talked to each other across a high speed intersystem bus, making a set of up to 15 servers seem to their users to be one big system. A built-in messaging system provided email-like functionality among system users, greatly aiding collaboration. Wire stories were funneled into the system electronically rather than having to be re-keyboarded from teletype printouts. The workflow advantages of the system proved popular with staff and management of newspapers and large magazine publishers. The proprietary keyboards included a number of innovations which greatly facilitated text entry and editing.

The system's early adopters in the daily newspaper industry included Newsday, The Hartford Courant, and the Minneapolis Star Tribune. Much of the growth can be traced to a series of patents Atex received in 1976 for its text editing and display system.

=== 1980s ===
In 1980 Atex developed a news pagination system for the Star Tribune. The resulting product, Atex News Layout, delivered ‘parallel pagination’, which allowed layout changes to automatically flow between copy editors and layout editors.

An April 1981 story in Computerworld magazine announced a new ATEX "System 7000" suitable for "medium-sized daily newspapers" and supporting up to 64 news and advertising terminals, with dual central processing units and system prices starting at $250,000.

Many of America's major dailies adopted Atex systems at some point, including The New York Times, Boston Globe, Philadelphia Inquirer, Chicago Daily News, Louisville Courier-Journal, Columbus Dispatch, St. Louis Post-Dispatch, Indianapolis Star, and Seattle Times. The Associated Press also used Atex to create and edit stories and to send them to its members over telephone circuits and via satellite.

The company was eventually acquired by Eastman Kodak for $77 million. Kodak thought Atex would help them access the commercial industry and build a strong customer based in emerging computer based technology.

In 1979 Atex for the first time expanded its operations outside the United States with implementation at the West Deutsche Allgemeine Zeitung (WAZ), which was headquartered in Essen Germany and which had five different titles throughout the North Rhine-Westphalia Region. Early in 1980 Atex quickly expanded its operation in Germany with Axel Springer Verlag Hoerzu, Bild Zeitung, Abendblatt, and Die Welt. This was the official release of the Integrated Advertising System, which introduced another major milestone and revolutionized newspaper advertising deadlines.

In the early-1980s Atex for the first time expanded its operations outside the United States with an implementation at The Economist and Maclean's Magazine in Toronto, La Tribune de Geneve in Geneva, La Suisse in Geneva, Le Nouvel Economiste in Brussels. In June 1980 Atex signed a contract with The Age, in Melbourne Australia, for a 320 terminal classified advertising system – at that time the largest advertising system in the world. This was followed in 1982 by a full editorial system.This was followed by major installation at Rupert Murdoch’s News International in 1985 and a $23 million contract with The New York Times in 1987.

Paul Brainerd left Atex in 1984 to found the Aldus Corporation and lead the creation of PageMaker.

=== 1990s ===
After nearly two decades of continuous growth, which included the construction of a 1,500 person manufacturing plant in the United States, Atex ran into difficult times at the beginning of the 1990s. Citing the need to refocus on its core business, Kodak sold the technology company to a group of European investors in 1992. Those investors started the development of Enterprise and Prestige, which were formerly the core of the Atex product portfolio.

The company's investors sought fresh investment in 1995, leading to a takeover by Sysdeco Group AS of Norway.

Sysdeco Group bought Atex and a Finnish supplier of editorial and classified systems, and became known as Sysdeco Media. The two acquisitions were not successful and in 1995 Atex was spun off again, becoming Atex Media Solutions, retaining its largest shareholder, Norwegian based Kistefos AS.

=== 2000s ===
Starting in 2002 when it merged with Media Command, Atex made a series of acquisitions.

With a new Group CEO, John Hawkins, Atex acquired, in 2006, the media business of Unisys Corporation and then in early 2007, Mactive, an advertising systems developer, which increased the US market share. In 2007 Atex also purchased Vogsys, a publishing technology company based in Rio de Janeiro, Brazil.

In 2008 the company acquired Swedish Java based Web CMS developer, Polopoly which added a digital platform. In 2010 Atex purchased the online classified platform Kaango.

In 2011, the company headquarters were moved to Castle Street in Reading, England, and Jim Rose was appointed as Group CEO. In June 2012, Rose left Atex after a seven-year career with the company, and Gary Stokes was appointed as Group CEO.

=== Constellation acquisition ===
In mid-2017 the company has been acquired by Constellation Software, a Canadian diversified software company that has acquired over 500 businesses since being founded.

Shortly after the acquisition, the new ownership appointed Federico Marturano (previously general manager of the Italian subsidiary) to group CEO.

In 2018 Atex acquired from the Finnish IT group, TietoEVRY, the Cross Advertising product.

== Products ==
- Desk: Multi Channel content management system for publishers, asset management, digital and print content production
- ACE: cloud based decoupled web cms
- Cross Advertising: Advertising Content Management System
- Insights: Newsroom Analytics
