= Cornerstone Christian Academy =

Cornerstone Christian Academy may refer to:

- Cornerstone Christian Academy (Bloomington, Illinois)
- Cornerstone Christian Academy (Ohio)

== See also ==
- Cornerstone Christian School
