= Codex =

Historical ancestor of the modern book

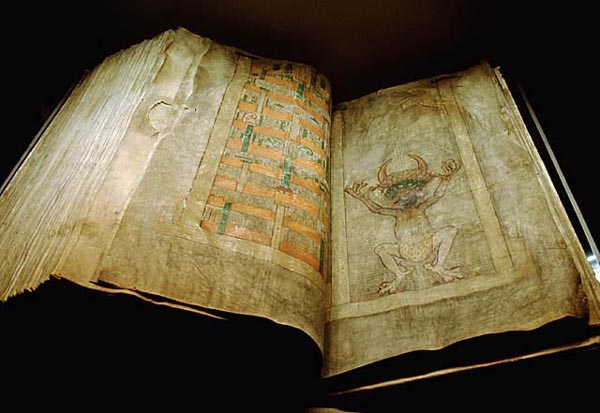
The Codex Gigas, 13th century, Bohemia

The codex (pl.: codices /ˈkoʊdɪsiːz/) is any historical book usually made out of sheets of vellum, parchment or papyrus. It was the ancestor of modern books. Technically, the vast majority of modern books use the codex format, of a stack of pages bound at one edge. However, the term codex is usually reserved for older manuscript books made out of the aforementioned materials.

By convention, the term is also used for any Aztec codex (although the earlier examples do not actually use the codex format), Maya codices and other pre-Columbian American manuscripts.

Library practices have led to many European manuscripts having "codex" as part of their usual name, as with the Codex Gigas, while most do not.

At least in the Western world, the main predecessor to the paged codex format for a long document was the continuous scroll (also of vellum, parchment or papyrus), which was the dominant form of document in the ancient world. Some codices are continuously folded like a concertina, in particular the Maya codices and Aztec codices, which are actually long sheets of paper or animal skin folded into pages. Concertina-style codices made of fibre-based paper were also developed in Tang dynasty China no later than the 9th century. This practice later spread to Heian Japan through Buddhist exchange, where they were called orihon.

The ancient Romans developed the form from wax tablets. The gradual replacement of the scroll by the codex has been called the most important advance in book making before the invention of the printing press. The codex transformed the shape of the book itself, and offered a form that has lasted ever since. The spread of the codex is often associated with the rise of Christianity, which early on adopted the format for Christian texts, such as patristic writings, liturgical texts, and the Bible. First described in the 1st century of the Common Era, when the Roman poet Martial praised its convenient use, the codex achieved numerical parity with the scroll around 300 CE, and had completely replaced it throughout what was by then a Christianized Greco-Roman world by the 6th century.

== Etymology and origins ==
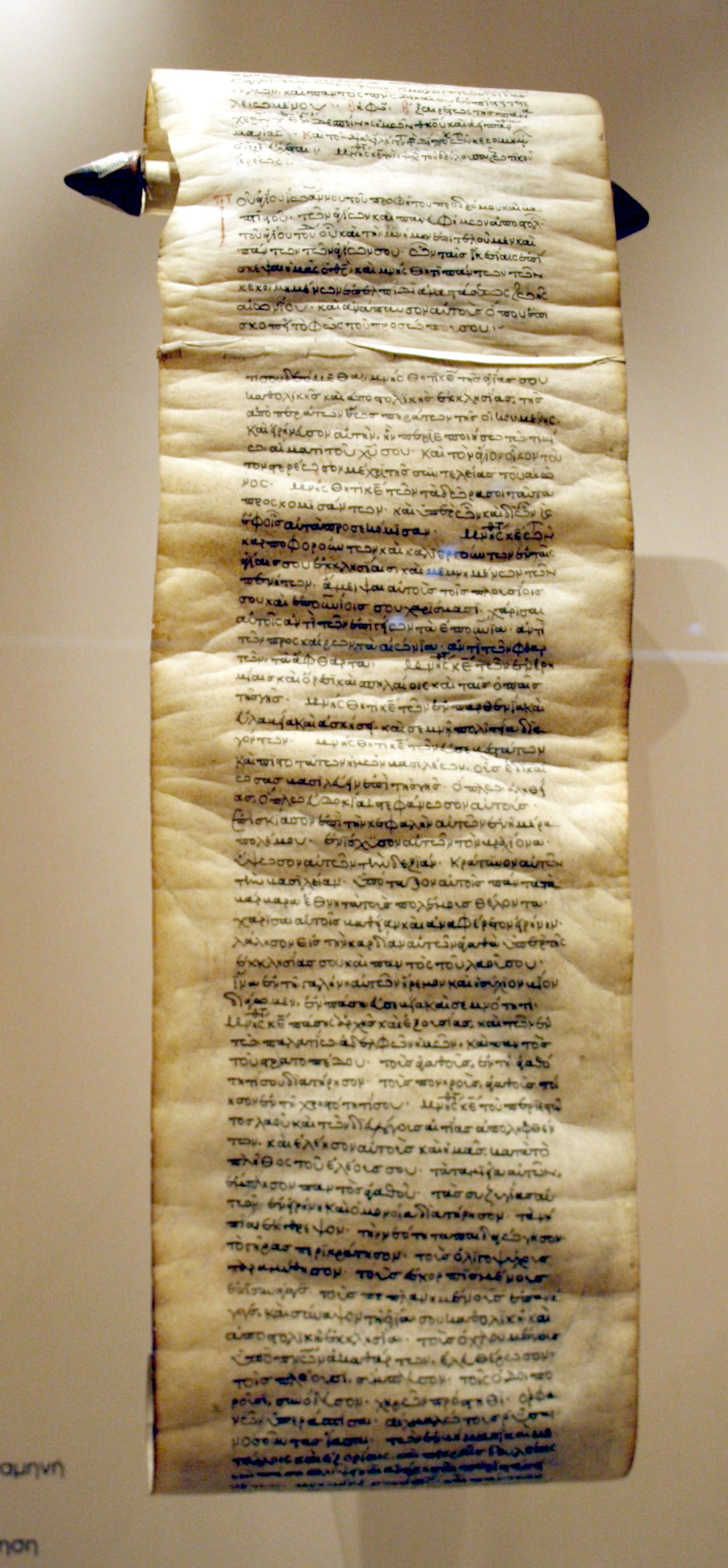
The scroll was the document form which was replaced by the codex during the late Roman Empire.

The word codex comes from the Latin word caudex, meaning "trunk of a tree", "block of wood" or "book". The codex began to replace the scroll almost as soon as it was invented, although new finds add three centuries to its history (see below). In Egypt, by the fifth century, the codex outnumbered the scroll by ten to one based on surviving examples. By the sixth century, the scroll had almost vanished as a medium for literature. The change from scrolls to codices roughly coincides with the transition from papyrus to parchment as the preferred writing material, but the two developments are unconnected. In fact, any combination of codices and scrolls with papyrus and parchment is technically feasible and common in the historical record.

Technically, even modern notebooks and paperbacks are codices, but publishers and scholars reserve the term for manuscript (hand-written) books produced from late antiquity until the Middle Ages. The scholarly study of these manuscripts is sometimes called codicology. The study of ancient documents in general is called paleography.

The codex provided considerable advantages over other book formats, primarily its compactness, sturdiness, economic use of materials by using both sides (recto and verso), and ease of reference (a codex accommodates random access, as opposed to a scroll, which uses sequential access).

== History ==
Reproduction Roman-style wax tablet, from which the codex evolved

The Romans used precursors made of reusable wax-covered tablets of wood for taking notes and other informal writings. Two ancient polyptychs, a pentaptych and octoptych excavated at Herculaneum, used a unique connecting system that presages later sewing on of thongs or cords. A first evidence of the use of papyrus in codex form comes from the Ptolemaic period in Egypt, as a find at the University of Graz shows.

Julius Caesar may have been the first Roman to reduce scrolls to bound pages in the form of a note-book, possibly even as a papyrus codex. At the turn of the 1st century AD, a kind of folded parchment notebook called pugillares membranei in Latin became commonly used for writing in the Roman Empire. Theodore Cressy Skeat theorized that this form of notebook was invented in Rome and then spread rapidly to the Near East.

Codices are described in certain works by the Classical Latin poet, Martial. He wrote a series of five couplets meant to accompany gifts of literature that Romans exchanged during the festival of Saturnalia. Three of these books are specifically described by Martial as being in the form of a codex; the poet praises the compendiousness of the form (as opposed to the scroll), as well as the convenience with which such a book can be read on a journey. In another poem by Martial, the poet advertises a new edition of his works, specifically noting that it is produced as a codex, taking less space than a scroll and being more comfortable to hold in one hand. According to Theodore Cressy Skeat, this might be the first recorded known case of an entire edition of a literary work (not just a single copy) being published in codex form, though it was likely an isolated case and was not a common practice until a much later time.

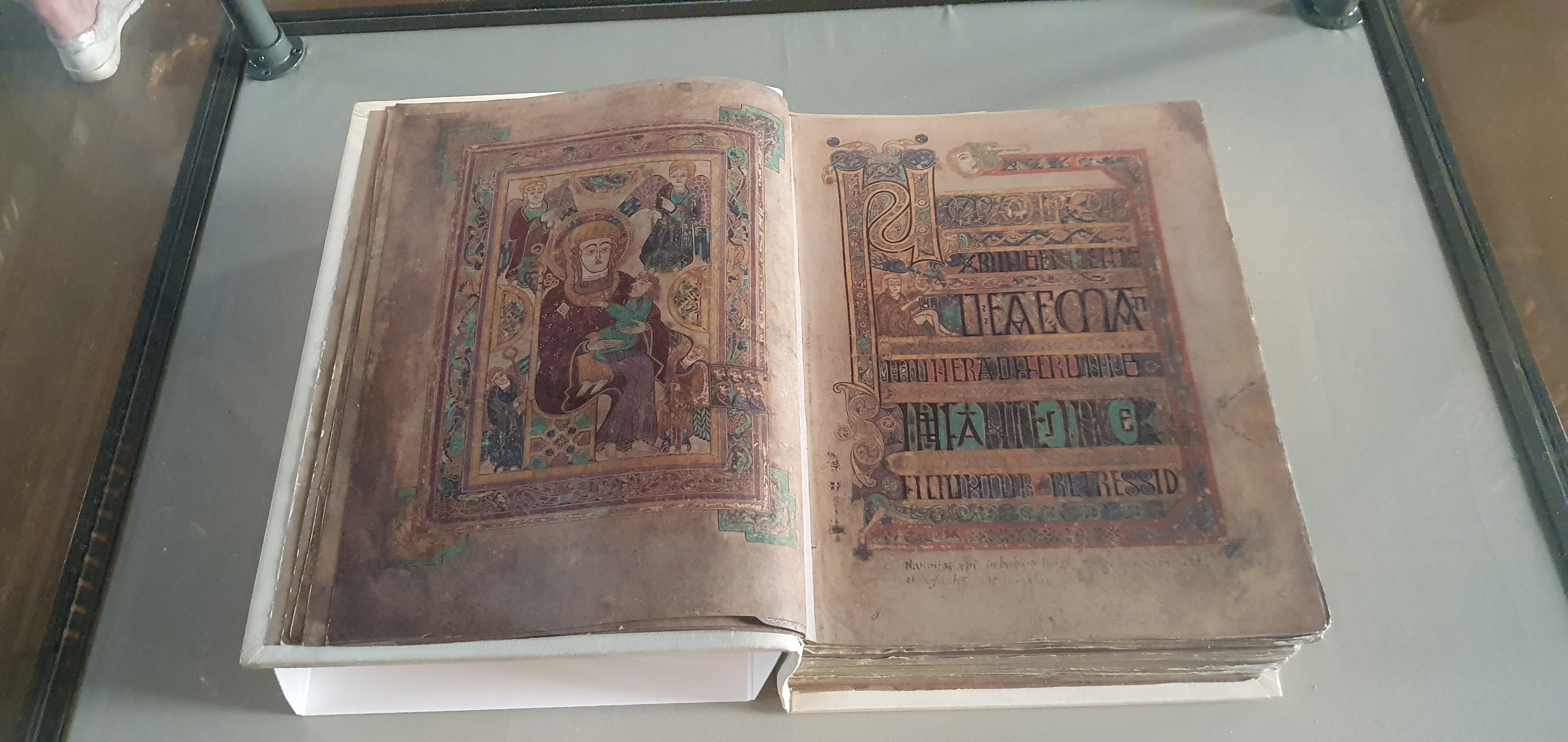
The Book of Kells is an example of a codex that was created during the Middle Ages.

In his discussion of one of the earliest parchment codices to survive from Oxyrhynchus in Egypt, Eric Turner seems to challenge Skeat's notion when stating, "its mere existence is evidence that this book form had a prehistory", and that "early experiments with this book form may well have taken place outside of Egypt." Early codices of parchment or papyrus appear to have been widely used as personal notebooks, for instance in recording copies of letters sent (Cicero Fam. 9.26.1). Early codices were not always cohesive. They often contained multiple languages, various topics, and even multiple authors. "Such codices formed libraries in their own right." The parchment notebook pages were "more durable, and could withstand being folded and stitched to other sheets". Parchments whose writing was no longer needed were commonly washed or scraped for re-use, creating a palimpsest; the erased text, which can often be recovered, is older and usually more interesting than the newer text which replaced it. Consequently, writings in a codex were often considered informal and impermanent. Parchment (animal skin) was expensive, and therefore it was used primarily by the wealthy and powerful, who were also able to pay for textual design and color. "Official documents and deluxe manuscripts [in the late Middle Ages] were written in gold and silver ink on parchment...dyed or painted with costly purple pigments as an expression of imperial power and wealth."

As early as the early 2nd century, there is evidence that a codex—usually of papyrus—was the preferred format among Christians. In the library of the Villa of the Papyri, Herculaneum (buried in AD 79), all the texts (of Greek literature) are scrolls (see Herculaneum papyri). However, in the Nag Hammadi library, hidden about AD 390, all texts (Gnostic) are codices. Despite this comparison, a fragment of a non-Christian parchment codex of Demosthenes' De Falsa Legatione from Oxyrhynchus in Egypt demonstrates that the surviving evidence is insufficient to conclude whether Christians played a major or central role in the development of early codices—or if they simply adopted the format to distinguish themselves from Jews.

The earliest surviving fragments from codices come from Egypt, and are variously dated (always tentatively) towards the end of the 1st century or in the first half of the 2nd. This group includes the Rylands Library Papyrus P52, containing part of St John's Gospel, and perhaps dating from between 125 and 160.

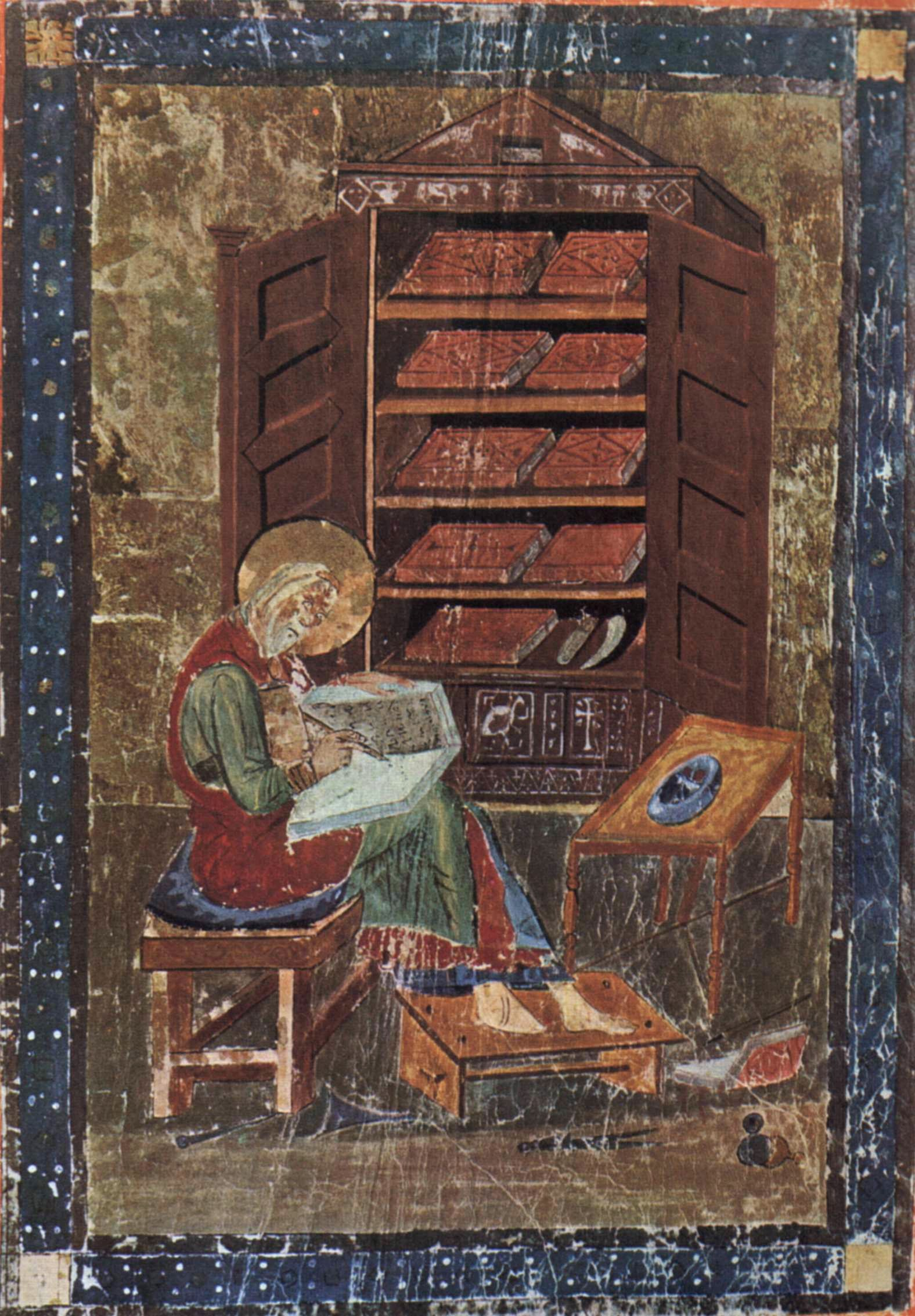
Early medieval bookcase containing about ten codices depicted in the Codex Amiatinus (c. 700)

In Western culture, the codex gradually replaced the scroll. Between the 4th century, when the codex gained wide acceptance, and the Carolingian Renaissance in the 8th century, many works that were not converted from scroll to codex were lost. The codex improved on the scroll in several ways. It could be opened flat at any page for easier reading, pages could be written on both front and back (recto and verso), and the protection of durable covers made it more compact and easier to transport.

The ancients stored codices with spines facing inward, and not always vertically. The spine could be used for the incipit, before the concept of a proper title developed in medieval times. Though most early codices were made of papyrus, the material was fragile and supplied from Egypt, the only place where papyrus grew. The more durable parchment and vellum gained favor, despite the cost.

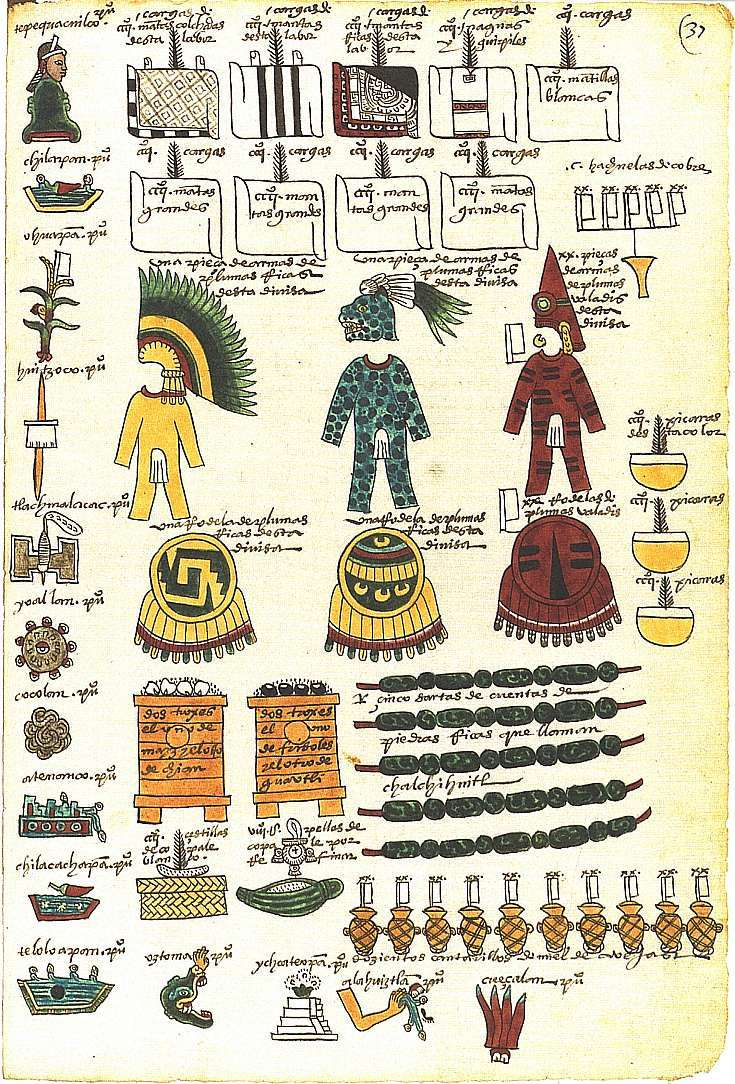
The Codex Mendoza, an Aztec codex from the early 16th century, showing the tribute obligations of particular towns

The codices of pre-Columbian Mesoamerica (Mexico and Central America) had a similar appearance when closed to the European codex, but were instead made with long folded strips of either fig bark (amatl) or plant fibers, often with a layer of whitewash applied before writing. New World codices were written as late as the 16th century (see Maya codices and Aztec codices). Those written before the Spanish conquests seem all to have been single long sheets folded concertina-style, sometimes written on both sides of the amatl paper. There are significant codices produced in the colonial era, with pictorial and alphabetic texts in Spanish or an indigenous language such as Nahuatl.

In East Asia, the scroll remained standard for far longer than in the Mediterranean world. There were intermediate stages, such as scrolls folded concertina-style and pasted together at the back and books that were printed only on one side of the paper. This replaced traditional Chinese writing mediums such as bamboo and wooden slips, as well as silk and paper scrolls. The evolution of the codex in China began with folded-leaf pamphlets in the 9th century, during the late Tang dynasty (618–907), improved by the 'butterfly' bindings of the Song dynasty (960–1279), the wrapped back binding of the Yuan dynasty (1271–1368), the stitched binding of the Ming (1368–1644) and Qing dynasties (1644–1912), and finally the adoption of Western-style bookbinding in the 20th century. The initial phase of this evolution, the accordion-folded palm-leaf-style book, most likely came from India and was introduced to China via Buddhist missionaries and scriptures.

Judaism still retains the Torah scroll, at least for ceremonial use.

== From scrolls to codices ==
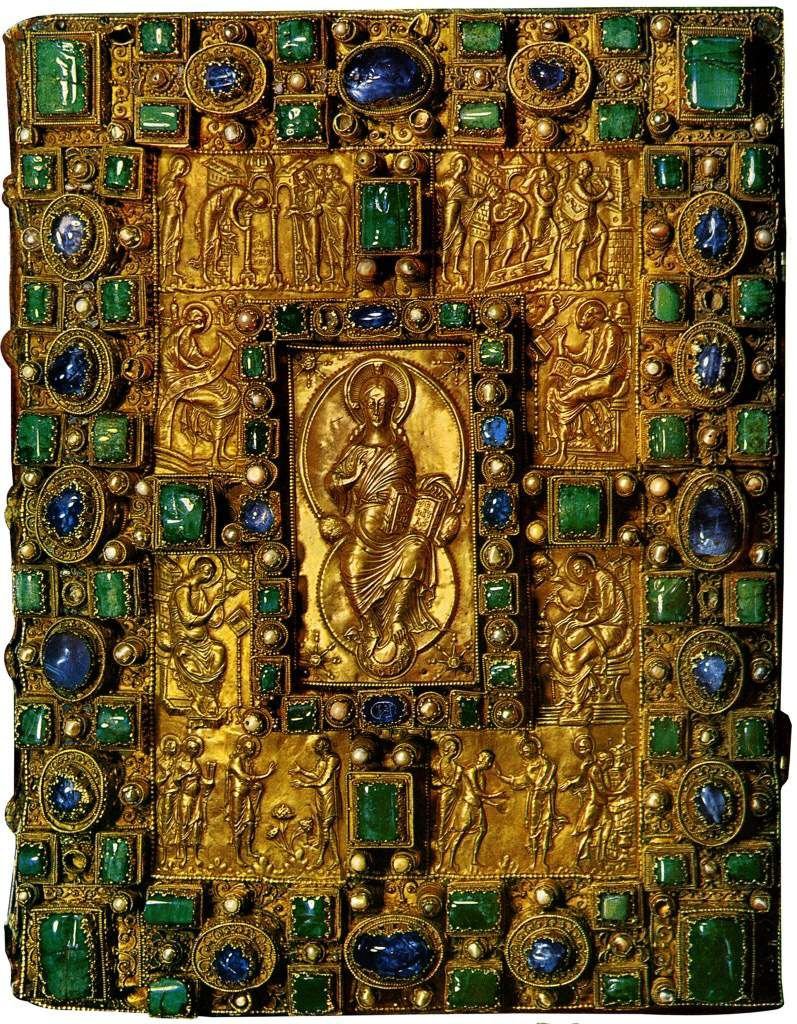
The cover of the Carolingian gospel book, the Codex Aureus of St. Emmeram, produced ca. AD 870 at the Palace of Aachen, during the reign of Charles the Bald. Bayerische Staatsbibliothek, Munich.

In earlier centuries, scribes experimented with laying out scrolls as a succession of columns read horizontally across the unrolled length. The Dead Sea Scrolls are a famous example of this format, and it remains the standard for Jewish Torah scrolls produced for ritual use today. The columnar layout effectively organized a continuous scroll into discrete page-like units, prefiguring the structure of the codex. The decisive step came when sheets of papyrus or vellum were folded, gathered into quires, and sewn through the fold, allowing both sides of each leaf to be used recto and verso as in a modern book.

Traditional bookbinders call one of these assembled, trimmed, and bound text blocks (the "pages" of the book as a whole, comprising the front matter and contents) a codex, in contradistinction to the cover, or case, producing the format of book now colloquially known as a hardcover. In the hardcover bookbinding process, the procedure for binding the codex is distinct from that of producing and attaching the case.

== Preparation ==
The first stage in creating a codex is to prepare the animal skin. The skin is washed with water and lime, but not together. The skin is soaked in the lime for a couple of days. The hair is removed, and the skin is dried by attaching it to a frame, called a herse. The parchment maker attaches the skin at points around the circumference. The skin attaches to the herse by cords. To prevent it from being torn, the maker wraps the area of the skin attached to the cord around a pebble called a pippin. After completing that, the maker uses a crescent-shaped knife called a lunarium or lunellum to remove any remaining hairs. Once the skin completely dries, the maker gives it a deep clean and processes it into sheets. The number of sheets from a piece of skin depends on the size of the skin and the final product dimensions. For example, the average calfskin can provide three-and-a-half medium sheets of writing material, which can be doubled when they are folded into two conjoint leaves, also known as a bifolium. Historians have found evidence of manuscripts in which the scribe wrote down the medieval instructions now followed by modern membrane makers. Defects can often be found in the membrane, whether they are from the original animal, human error during the preparation period, or from when the animal was killed. Defects can also appear during the writing process. Unless the manuscript is kept in perfect condition, defects can also appear later in its life.

=== Preparation of pages for writing ===
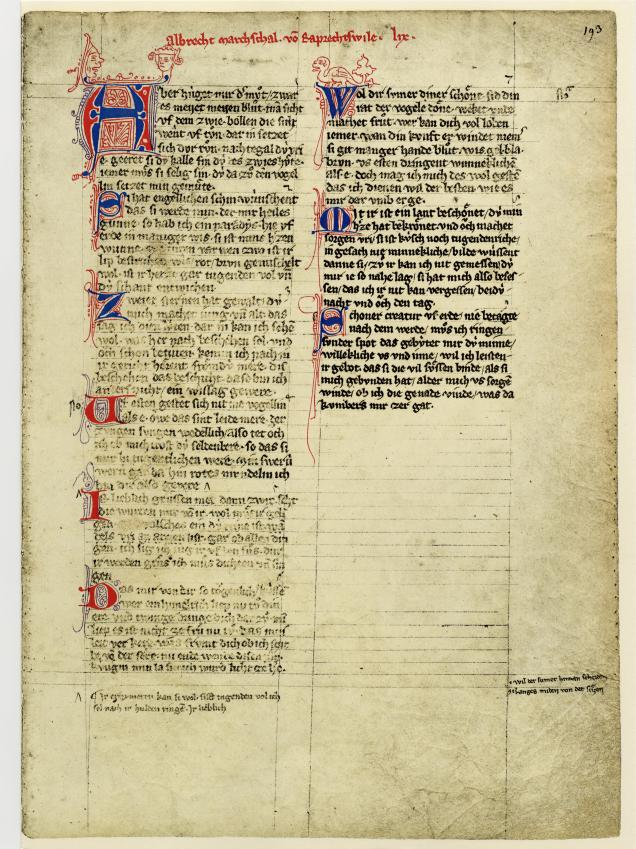
The Codex Manesse. Most manuscripts were ruled with horizontal lines that served as the baselines on which the text was written.

Firstly, the membrane must be prepared. The first step is to set up the quires. The quire is a group of several sheets put together. Raymond Clemens and Timothy Graham point out, in "Introduction to Manuscript Studies", that "the quire was the scribe's basic writing unit throughout the Middle Ages":

Pricking is the process of making holes in a sheet of parchment (or membrane) in preparation of it ruling. The lines were then made by ruling between the prick marks.... The process of entering ruled lines on the page to serve as a guide for entering text. Most manuscripts were ruled with horizontal lines that served as the baselines on which the text was entered and with vertical bounding lines that marked the boundaries of the columns.

=== Forming quire ===
From the Carolingian period to the end of the Middle Ages, different styles of folding the quire came about. For example, in continental Europe throughout the Middle Ages, the quire was put into a system in which each side folded on to the same style. The hair side met the hair side and the flesh side to the flesh side. This was not the same style used in the British Isles, where the membrane was folded so that it turned out an eight-leaf quire, with single leaves in the third and sixth positions. The next stage was tacking the quire. Tacking is when the scribe would hold together the leaves in quire with thread. Once threaded together, the scribe would then sew a line of parchment up the "spine" of the manuscript to protect the tacking.

=== Materials ===
The materials codices are made with are their support, and include papyrus, parchment (sometimes referred to as membrane or vellum), and paper. They are written and drawn on with metals, pigments, and ink. The quality, size, and choice of support determine the status of a codex. Papyrus is found only in late antiquity and the Early Middle Ages. Codices intended for display were bound with more durable materials than vellum. Parchment varied widely due to animal species and finish, and identification of animals used to make it has only begun to be studied in the 21st century. How manufacturing influenced the final products, technique, and style is little understood. However, changes in style are underpinned more by variation in technique. Before the 14th and 15th centuries, paper was expensive, and its use may mark off the deluxe copy.

=== Structure ===
The structure of a codex includes its size, format/ordinatio (its quires or gatherings), consisting of sheets folded a number of times, often twice- a bifolio, sewing, bookbinding, and rebinding. A quire consisted of a number of folded sheets inserted into one another- at least three, but most commonly four bifolia, that is eight sheets and sixteen pages: Latin quaternio or Greek tetradion, which became a synonym for quires. Unless an exemplar (text to be copied) was copied exactly, the format differed. In preparation for writing codices, ruling patterns were used that determined the layout of each page. Holes were prickled with a spiked lead wheel and a circle. Ruling was then applied separately on each page or once through the top folio. Ownership markings, decorations, and illumination are also a part of it. They are specific to the scriptoria, or any production center, and libraries of codices.

=== Pages ===
Watermarks may provide, although often approximate, dates for when the copying occurred. The layout (size of the margin and the number of lines) is determined. There may be textual articulations, running heads, openings, chapters, and paragraphs. Space was reserved for illustrations and decorated guide letters. The apparatus of books for scholars became more elaborate during the 13th and 14th centuries when chapter, verse, page numbering, marginalia finding guides, indexes, glossaries, and tables of contents were developed.

=== Binding ===
Modern bookbinding deals with paper sheets of uniform dimensions, and products for mass-market sale are generally utilitarian. Elaborate historical bindings are called treasure bindings.

=== The libraire ===
By a close examination of the physical attributes of a codex, it is sometimes possible to match up long-separated elements originally from the same book. In the 13th century book publishing, due to secularization, stationers or libraires emerged. They would receive commissions for texts, which they would contract out to scribes, illustrators, and binders, to whom they supplied materials. Due to the systematic format used for assembly by the libraire, the structure can be used to reconstruct the original order of a manuscript. However, complications can arise in the study of a codex. Manuscripts were frequently rebound, and this resulted in a particular codex incorporating works of different dates and origins, thus different internal structures. Additionally, a binder could alter or unify these structures to ensure a better fit for the new binding. Completed quires or books of quires might constitute independent book units- booklets, which could be returned to the stationer, or combined with other texts to make anthologies or miscellanies. Exemplars were sometimes divided into quires for simultaneous copying and loaned out to students for study. To facilitate this, catchwords were used- a word at the end of a page providing the next page's first word.

== See also ==
- Grimoire
- History of books
- History of scrolls
- Index (publishing)
- List of codices
- List of florilegia and botanical codices
- List of New Testament papyri
- List of New Testament uncials
- Traditional Chinese bookbinding
- Volume (bibliography)

== General and cited references ==
- Diringer, David (1982). The Book Before Printing: Ancient, Medieval and Oriental. New York: Courier Dover Publications. ISBN 0-486-24243-9.
- Hurtado, L. W. (2006). The Earliest Christian Artifacts: Manuscripts and Christian Origins. Cambridge.
- Lyons, Martyn (2011). Books: A Living History. Los Angeles: J. Paul Getty Museum. ISBN 978-1-60606-083-4.
- Needham, Joseph; Tsien, Tsuen-Hsuin (1985). Science and Civilization in China: Volume 5: Chemistry and Chemical Technology, Part 1: Paper and Printing. Cambridge University Press. ISBN 0-521-08690-6.
- Roberts, Colin H.; Skeat, T. C. (1983). The Birth of the Codex. London: Oxford University Press. ISBN 0-19-726024-1.
- Skeat, T.C. (2004). The Collected Biblical Writings of T.C. Skeat. Leiden: E.J. Brill. p. 45. ISBN 90-04-13920-6.
- Turner, Eric (1977). The Typology of the Early Codex. Philadelphia: University of Pennsylvania Press. ISBN 978-0-8122-7696-1.
