= Author page =

Page in a book that is about the author

In book design, the author page is a section of a book or other literary work that consists of a short—usually a single page long—biography of the author, sometimes accompanied by a photograph of them. Written in the third-person narrative, this page is usually entitled "about the author", resulting in the synonymous name "about the author page". The author page appears in the back matter (end matter) of a book, usually as the final page; thus, it does not possess a page number. However, in print, it may be followed by the flyleaf (a blank page).

== Overview ==
The author page is a section of a book or other literary work that consists of a short biography of the author. Written in the third-person narrative and sometimes accompanied by a photograph, the author page is usually a single page long, consisting of only a few sentences. Biographical information typically includes the author's academic background, career achievements, awards, information on one's personal life and a list of other publications by the author. The author page appears in the back matter (end matter) of a book, usually as the final page; thus, it does not possess a page number. However, it is sometimes followed by the colophon. In print, it may be followed by the flyleaf (a blank page).

== Variations ==
Biographical information about the author may also appear on the back cover of a book or on its dust jacket.
