= Vellum =

Animal skin used as a writing material

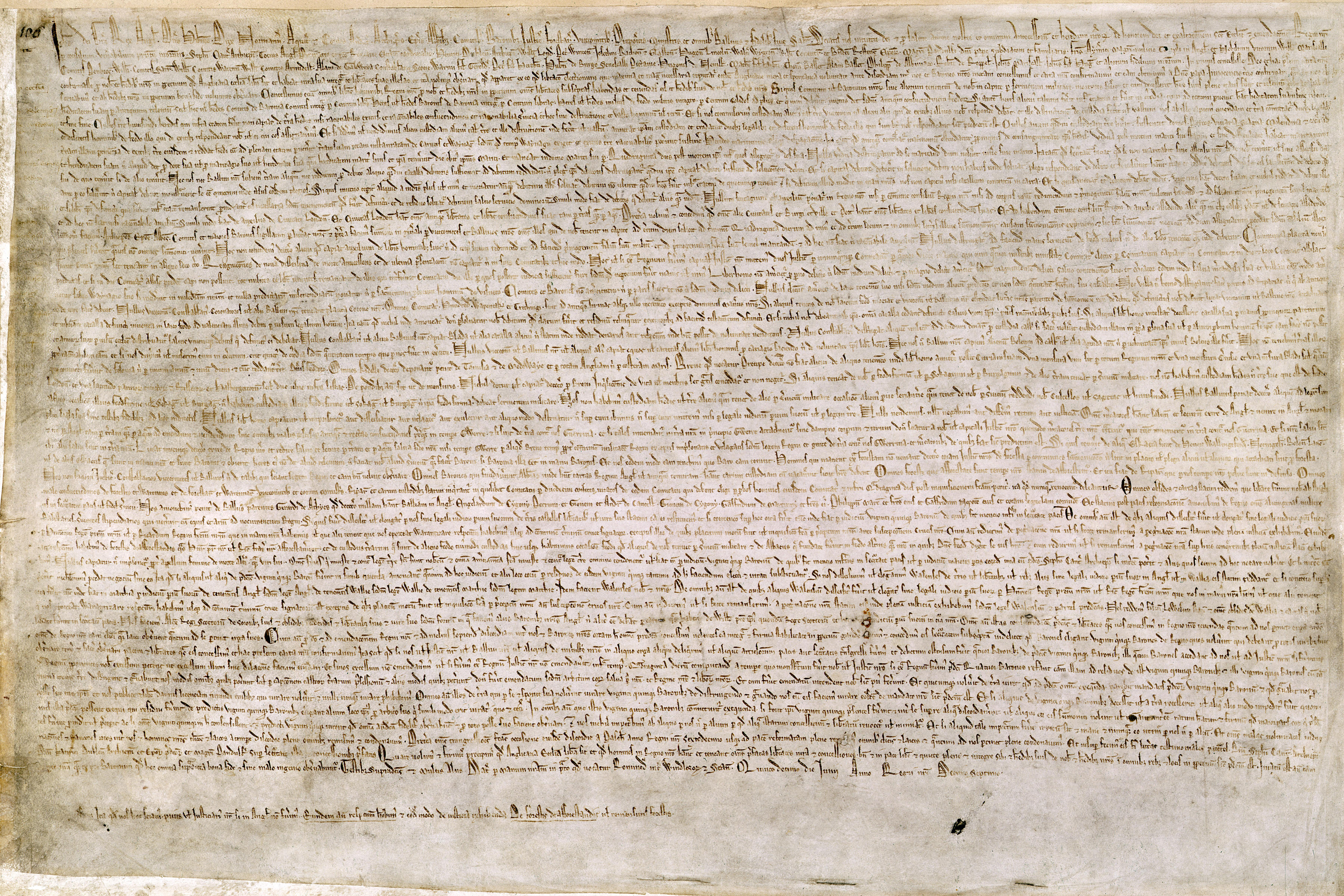
Magna Carta, written in Latin on vellum, held at the British Library

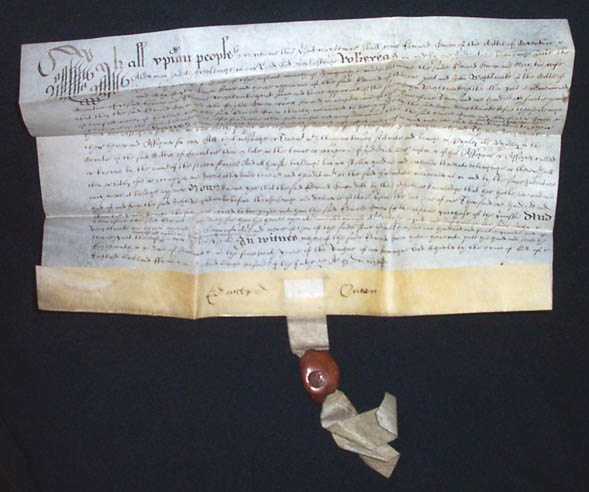
A vellum deed dated 1638, with pendent seal attached

Vellum is prepared animal skin or membrane, typically used as writing material. It is often distinguished from parchment, either by being made from calfskin, rather than the skin of other animals, or simply by being of a higher quality. Vellum is prepared for writing and printing on single pages, scrolls, and codices.

Vellum is generally smooth and durable, but there can be significant variations in texture due to how it is made and the quality of the skin used. The making of vellum involves the cleaning, bleaching, stretching on a frame, and scraping of the skin with a lunellum.

Modern paper vellum is made of plant cellulose fibers and gets its name from having a similar use to actual vellum, as well as its high quality.

== Description ==
The making of vellum involves the cleaning, bleaching, stretching on a frame (herse), and scraping of the skin with a crescent-shaped knife (lunellum). To create tension, the process alternates between scraping, wetting, and drying. The surface is then cleaned with pumice, and treated with lime or chalk to make it suitable for writing, and to give it its final look.

== Terminology ==
Modern scholars and experts often prefer to use the broader term membrane, which avoids the need to draw a distinction between vellum and parchment, as it is very hard to determine the type of animal involved, let alone its age, without detailed scientific analysis.

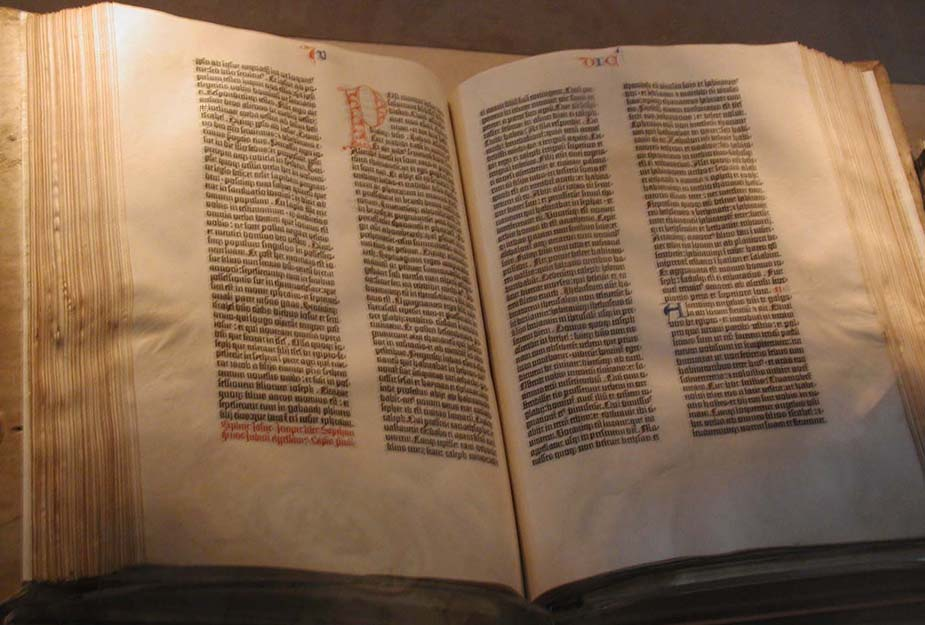
A vellum copy of the Gutenberg Bible owned by the U.S. Library of Congress

Though Christopher de Hamel, an expert on medieval manuscripts, writes that "for most purposes the words parchment and vellum are interchangeable", a number of distinctions have been made in the past and present.

The word vellum is borrowed from Old French vélin 'calfskin', derived in turn from the Latin word vitulinum 'made from calf'. However, in Europe, from Roman times, the word was used for the best quality of prepared skin, regardless of the animal from which the hide was obtained. Calf, sheep, and goat were all commonly used, and other animals, including pig, deer, donkey, horse, or camel, were used on occasion. The best quality, "uterine vellum", was said to be made from the skins of stillborn or unborn animals, although the term was also applied to fine quality skins made from young animals. However, there has long been much blurring of the boundaries between these terms. In 1519, William Horman would write in his Vulgaria: "That stouffe that we wrytte upon, and is made of beestis skynnes, is somtyme called parchement, somtyme velem, somtyme abortyve, somtyme membraan." Writing in 1936, Lee Ustick explained that:

To-day the distinction, among collectors of manuscripts, is that vellum is a highly refined form of skin, parchment a cruder form, usually thick, harsh, less highly polished than vellum, but with no distinction between skin of calf, or sheep, or of goat.

French sources, closer to the original etymology, tend to define velin as from calf only, while the British Standards Institution defines parchment as made from the split skin of several species, and vellum from the unsplit skin. In the usage of modern practitioners of the artistic crafts of writing, illuminating, lettering, and bookbinding, vellum is normally reserved for calfskin, while any other skin is called parchment.

== Manufacture ==
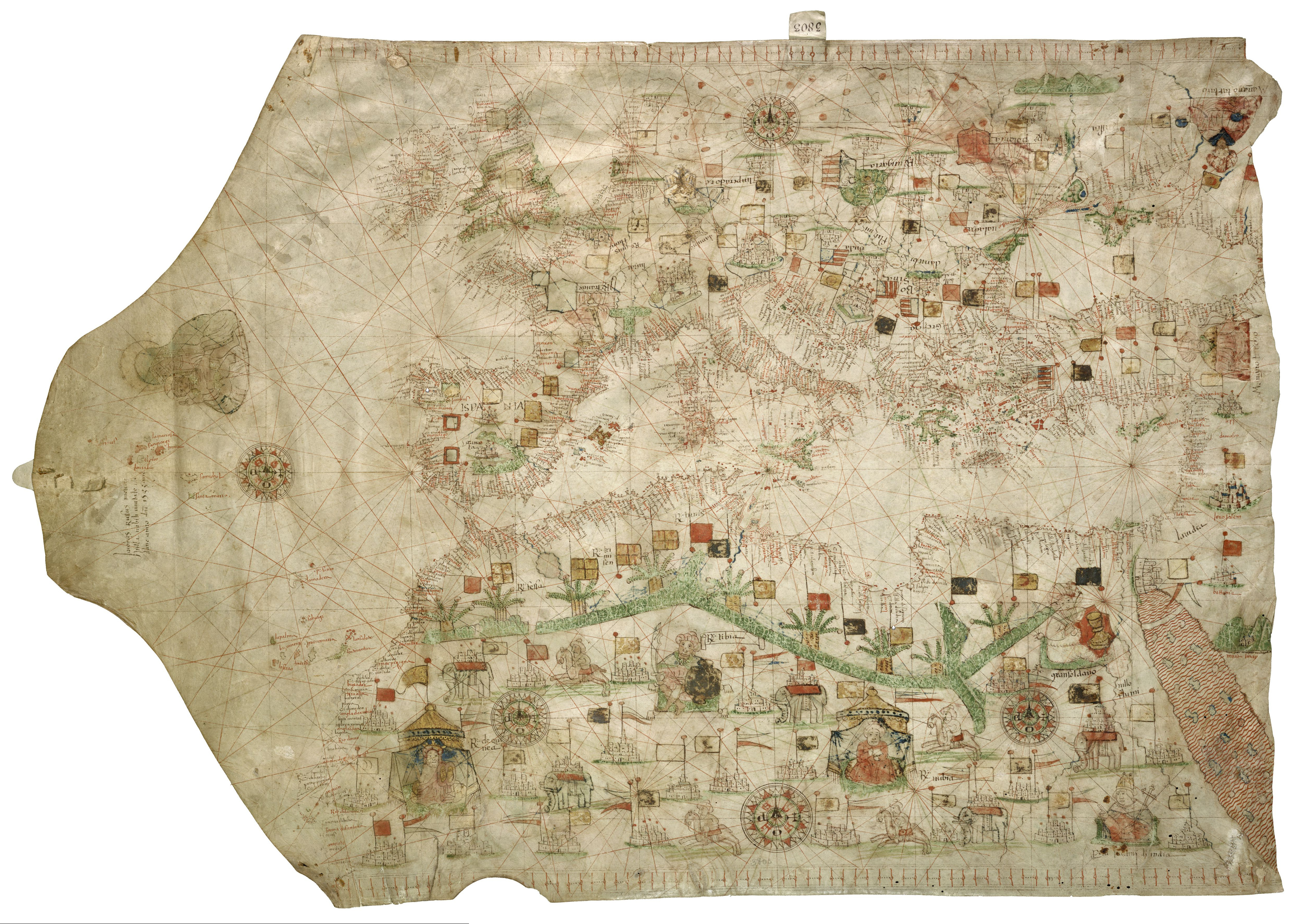
A portolan chart (map) by Jacopo Russo (Giacomo Russo) of Messina (1533)

Vellum allows some light to pass through it. It is made from the skin of a young animal. The skin is washed with water and lime (calcium hydroxide), and then soaked in lime for several days to soften and remove the hair.

Once clear, the two sides of the skin are distinct: the body side and the hairy side. The "inside body side" of the skin is usually the lighter and more refined of the two.

The hair follicles may be visible on the outer side, together with any scars from when the animal was alive. The membrane can also show the pattern of the animal's vein network called the veining of the sheet.

Any remaining hair is removed (scudding) and to dry it out the skin is attached to a frame (a herse) at points around the edge with cords, which is then wrapped by the part next to these points around a pebble (a pippin). The skin is then cleaned with a crescent-shaped knife, (a "lunarium" or "lunellum") removing any remaining hairs.

The skin is thoroughly cleaned and processed into sheets once it is completely dry. Many sheets can be extracted from a single piece of skin. The number of sheets depends on the size of the skin and the required length and breadth of each individual sheet. For example, the average calfskin could provide roughly three and a half medium sheets of writing material. Sheet amount can be doubled by folding the skin into two conjoined leaves, also known as a bifolium. Historians have found evidence of manuscripts where the scribe wrote down the medieval instructions, which is now followed by modern vellum makers. The makers rubbed the sheets with a round, flat object ("pouncing") to ensure that the ink would adhere to the surface. Even so, some types of ink would gradually flake off as the membrane was folded, rolled, or rubbed.

== Manuscripts ==
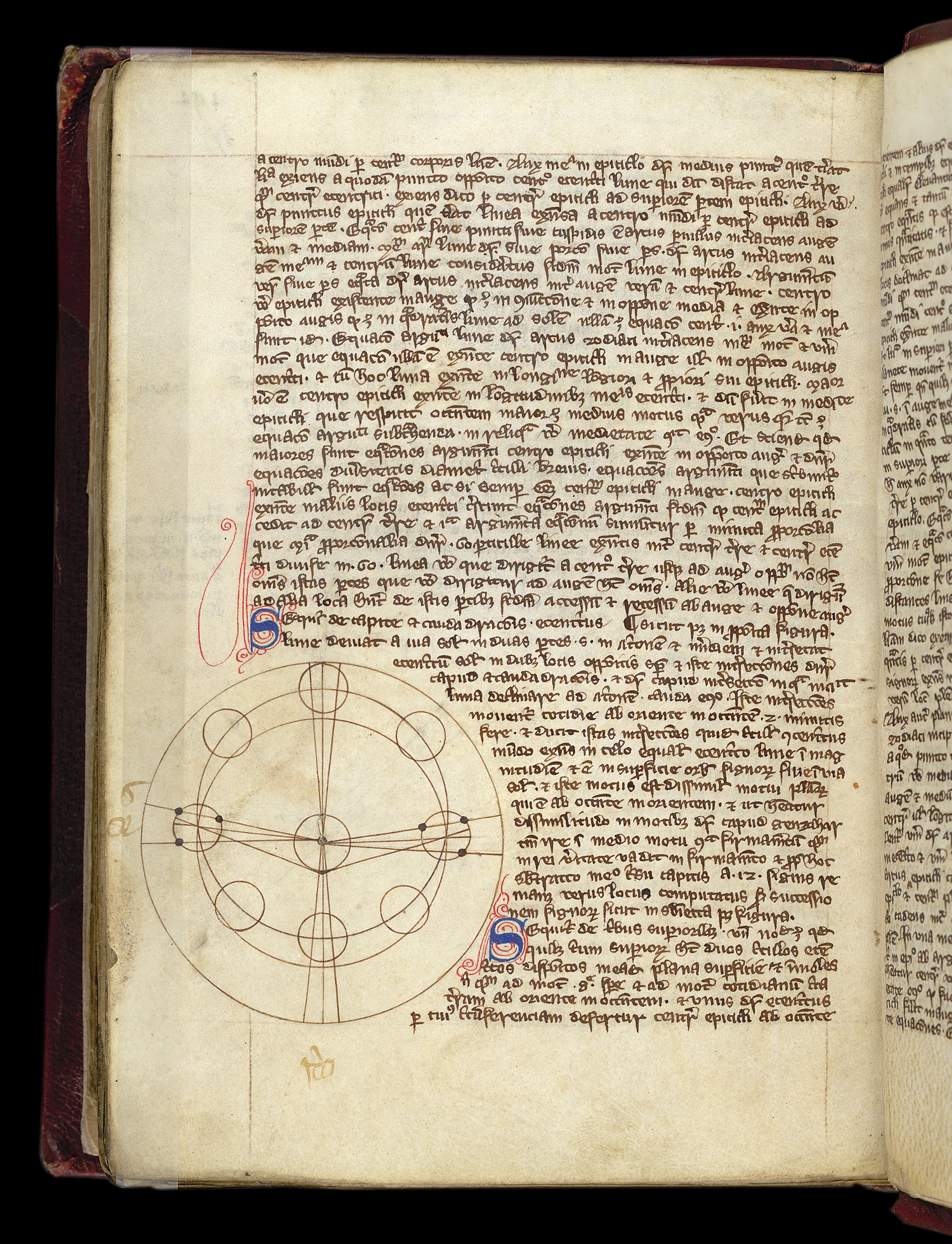
A Volume of Treatises on Natural Science, Philosophy, and Mathematics (1300) Ink on vellum.

=== Preparing manuscripts ===
Once the vellum is prepared, traditionally a quire is formed of a group of several sheets. Raymond Clemens and Timothy Graham point out, in their Introduction to Manuscript Studies, that "the quire was the scribe's basic writing unit throughout the Middle Ages". Guidelines are then made on the membrane. They note "'pricking' is the process of making holes in a sheet of parchment (or membrane) in preparation for its ruling. The lines were then made by ruling between the prick marks...The process of entering ruled lines on the page serves as a guide for entering text. Most manuscripts were ruled with horizontal lines that served as the baselines on which the text was entered and with vertical bounding lines that marked the boundaries of the columns".

=== Usage ===
Most of the finer sort of medieval manuscripts, whether illuminated or not, were written on vellum. Some Gandhāran Buddhist texts were written on vellum, and all Sifrei Torah (Hebrew: ספר תורה Sefer Torah; plural: ספרי תורה, Sifrei Torah) are written on kosher klaf or vellum.

A quarter of the 180-copy edition of Johannes Gutenberg's first Bible printed in 1455 with movable type was also printed on vellum, presumably because his market expected this for a high-quality book. Paper was used for most book printing, as it was cheaper and easier to process through a printing press and bind. The twelfth-century Winchester Bible was also written on approximately 250 calfskins.

In art, vellum was used for paintings, especially if they needed to be sent long distances, before canvas became widely used in about 1500, and continued to be used for drawings, and watercolours. Old master prints were sometimes printed on vellum, especially for presentation copies, until at least the seventeenth century.

Limp vellum or limp-parchment bindings were used frequently in the 16th and 17th centuries, and were sometimes gilt but were also often not embellished. In later centuries, vellum was more commonly used like leather, that is, as the covering for stiff board bindings. Vellum can be stained virtually any color, but seldom is, as a great part of its beauty and appeal rests in its faint grain and hair markings, as well as its warmth and simplicity.

Lasting in excess of 1,000 years—for example, Pastoral Care (Troyes, Bibliothèque Municipale, MS 504), dates from about 600 and is in excellent condition—animal vellum can be far more durable than paper. For this reason, many important documents are written on animal vellum, such as diplomas. Referring to a diploma as a "sheepskin" alludes to the time when diplomas were written on vellum made from animal hides.

=== Modern usage ===
British Acts of Parliament are still printed on vellum for archival purposes, as are those of the Republic of Ireland. In February 2016, the UK House of Lords announced that legislation would be printed on archival paper instead of the traditional vellum from April 2016. However, Cabinet Office Minister Matthew Hancock intervened by agreeing to fund the continued use of vellum from the Cabinet Office budget. On 2017, the House of Commons Commission agreed that it would provide front and back vellum covers for record copies of Acts.

Today, because of low demand and a complicated manufacturing process, animal vellum is expensive and hard to find. The only UK company still producing traditional parchment and vellum is William Cowley (established 1870), which is based in Newport Pagnell, Buckinghamshire. A modern imitation is made of cotton. Known as paper vellum, this material is considerably cheaper than animal vellum and can be found in most art and drafting supply stores. Some brands of writing paper and other sorts of paper use the term "vellum" to suggest quality.

Vellum is still used for Jewish scrolls, particularly the Torah, for luxury bookbinding, memorial books, and various documents in calligraphy. It is also used on instruments such as the banjo and the bodhran, although synthetic skins are available for these instruments and have become more commonly used.

The Catholic Church still issues its decrees and diplomas for its officials on vellum.

==== Paper vellum ====
Modern paper vellum is made from plant cellulose fibers and gets its name from its use similar to that of actual vellum, as well as its high quality. It is used for a variety of purposes, including tracing, technical drawings, plans, and blueprints. Tracing paper is essentially the same thing, though the quality level differs, sometimes greatly. In printing and stationery, vellum may also refer to a textured finish on opaque paper or cardstock, including stock used for some menus, presentation folders, and book covers, separate from translucent paper vellum.

== Preservation ==
Vellum is ideally stored in a stable environment with a constant temperature and 30% (±5%) relative humidity. If vellum is stored in an environment with less than 11% relative humidity, it becomes fragile and vulnerable to mechanical stresses. However, if it is stored in an environment with greater than 40% relative humidity, it becomes vulnerable to gelation and to mould or fungus growth. The optimal relative humidity for proper storage of vellum does not overlap that of paper, which poses a challenge for libraries. The optimal temperature for the keeping of vellum is approximately 20 °C (68 °F).

== See also ==
- Calfskin
- Coated paper, some types are imitation vellum
- Drafting film
- History of hide materials
- Parchment
