= Raúl Rosarivo =

Argentine typographer (1903–1966)

Raúl Mario Rosarivo (1903 in Buenos Aires, Argentina – 1966) was an Argentine typographer, researcher, designer, poet, painter, and illustrator, known for his work in the analysis of the Gutenberg Bibles. He held the position of General Director of the Buenos Aires Provincial Graphic Workshops (Talleres Gráficos de la Provincia de Buenos Aires).

Rosarivo, in his Divina proporción tipográfica ("Typographical Divine Proportion"), first published in 1947, analyzed Renaissance books with the help of compass and ruler and described the use of the "número de oro" (golden number), by which he meant the ratio 2:3, in books produced by Gutenberg (as well as Peter Schöffer, Nicolas Jenson, and others). According to Rosarivo himself, his work and assertion that Gutenberg used the "golden number" (or "secret number" as Rosarivo also called it) to establish the harmonic relationships between the diverse parts of his printed works, was analyzed by experts at the Gutenberg Museum and re-published in the Gutenberg Jahrbuch, its official magazine.

== Bibliography ==
=== Spanish ===
- Divina proporción tipográfica, La Plata, Argentina (1953). Previous editions: 1948 and 1947. A brief discussion about his work, is available online in Spanish
- Romances de Medianoche - Kraft, Buenos Aires, 1943. Collection of poems.
- Cómo Formar el Espíritu de la Imprenta, Buenos Aires, 1946
- De la Unidad Artística del Libro. Consideraciones críticas y ensayo de una técnica racional para uso de diagramaciones gráficas. Semca, Buenos Aires, 1947.
- Crónica de Johann Gutenberg, Cámara de Industriales Gráfios de la Argentina (CIGA), Buenos Aires, 1955.
- Historia General del Libro Impreso - Ediciones Áureas, Buenos Aires, 1964.

=== German ===
- Die Masszahl 1,5 als esthätische Norm tipographischer Grössenverhältnisse, Professor Raúl Rosarivo, Buenos Aires, Argentinien. Übersetzung: Heinz H. Schmiedt (Der Druckspiegel, Stuttgart,1957).
- Goldene Proportionen des "Psalteriums". von Fust und Schöffer, mit drei Abbildungen von Professor Raúl Rosarivo, Buenos Aires, Argentinien (Gutenberg Jahrbuch, Mainz, 1958).
- Das Buch vom Goldenen Typografischen Modul 1:1,5. Das Modul von Johann Gutenberg und seiner Zeitgenossen in der Proportion 2:3. Übersetzt aus dem spanischen von Heinz Nieth. Bearbeitung der deutschen Ausgabe von Hermann Zapf. Scherpe Verlag, Krefeld, 1961.

== See also ==
- Book design
- Canons of page construction
- Jan Tschichold
