= Sidebar (publishing) =

Information placed adjacent to articles

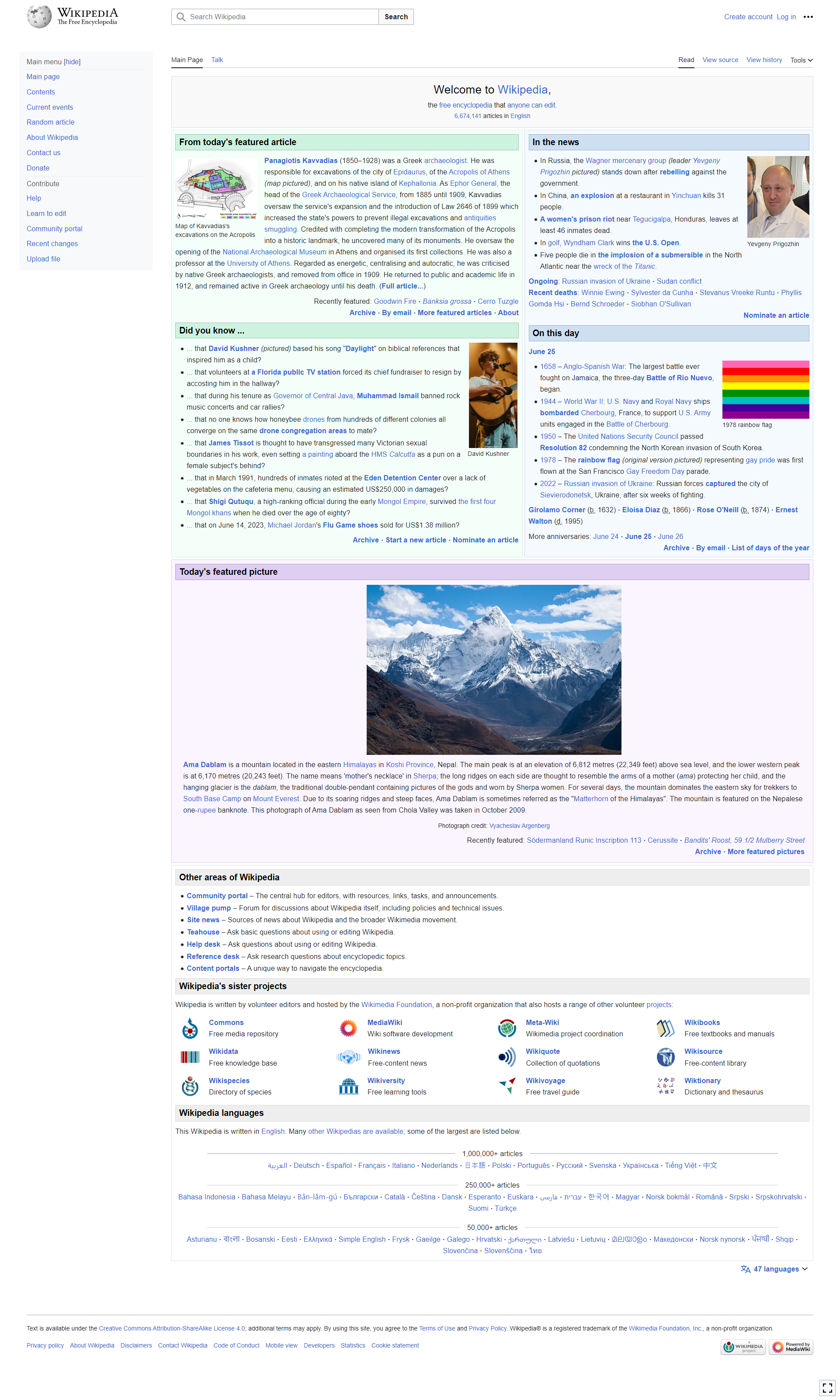
Wikipedia's layout features a sidebar on the left side.

In publishing, sidebar is a term for information placed adjacent to an article in a printed or Web publication, graphically separate but with contextual connection.

The term has long been used in newspaper and magazine page layout. It is often used as the title of legal groups' publications in the US as a pun on "the bar", a term for the legal profession: The Federal Bar Association, Montgomery Bar Association of Norristown Pennsylvania, and the Westmoreland Bar Association are 3 examples.

It is now common in Web design, where sidebars originated as advertising space and have evolved to contain information such as quick links to other parts of the site, or links to related materials on other sites. Online sidebars often include small bits of information such as quotes, polls, lists, pictures, site tools, etc.

== See also ==
- Boxout
