= Book design =

Styling, formatting and designing the layout of a book's contents

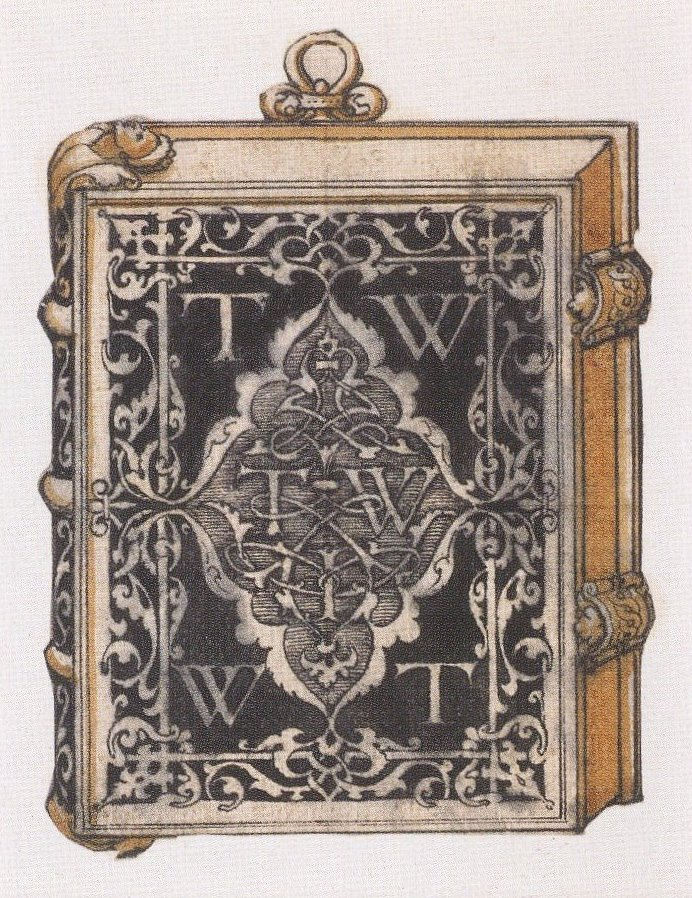
Design by Hans Holbein the Younger for a metalwork book cover (or treasure binding)

Book design is the graphic art of determining the visual and physical characteristics of a book. The design process begins after an author and editor finalize the manuscript, at which point it is passed to the production stage. During production, graphic artists, art directors, or professionals in similar roles will work with printing press operators to decide on visual elements—including typography, margins, illustrations, and page layout—and physical features, such as trim size, type of paper, kind of printing, binding.

From the late Middle Ages to the 21st century, the basic structure and organization of Western books have remained largely unchanged. Front matter introduces readers to the book, offering practical information like the title, author and publisher details, and an overview of the content. It may also include editorial or authorial notes providing context. This is followed by the main content of the book, often broadly organized into chapters or sections. The book concludes with back matter, which may include bibliographies, appendices, indexes, glossaries, or errata.

Effective book design is a critical part of publishing, helping to communicate an author's message and satisfy readers and often having great influence on the commercial, scholarly, or artistic value of a work. Designers use established principles and rules developed in the centuries following the advent of printing.

Contemporary artists, designers, researchers, and artisans who have contributed to the many theories of typography and book design include Jan Tschichold, Josef Müller-Brockman, Paul Rand, Johanna Drucker, Ellen Lupton, William Lidwell and others.

== Structure ==
=== Front matter ===
Front matter is the initial section of a book, typically containing the fewest pages. Traditionally, front matter pages do not have a folio (the printed page number), unless it is a multi-paged piece of text such as a foreword, introduction, or preface. Front matter pages are numbered using lower-case Roman numerals. If there is no praise page, a book begins numbering with the letter i. This practice allows for additional content, like dedication pages or acknowledgments, to be inserted without affecting the numbering of the main text. Page numbers are usually omitted on blank and stand-alone display pages such as the half-title, frontispiece, title page, colophon, dedication, and epigraph. Additionally, page numbers may either be omitted or presented as a drop folio on the first page of each new front matter section, such as the table of contents, foreword, or preface. In multi-volume works, the front matter typically appears only in the first volume, although some elements like the table of contents or an index may be repeated in each volume. Possible elements of front matter include:

Name	Purpose
Front endpapers	Decorative paper affixed to the inside cover; may have additional uses. (Not numbered, and may not be considered technically part of the front matter or even technically a page at all.)
Half title	The first page of a printed book (no folio) containing only the title and nothing else, save for minor ornamentation. Traditional a single line of capital letters, the modern half title pages is often a scaled-down title in the same style as the title page. The half title is always on a recto (right-hand) page.
Frontispiece	A decorative illustration on the verso facing the title page that can be an image or illustration related to the book's subject or a portrait of the author. Increasingly uncommon, the space is usually blank or replaced by a list of the author's previous works or other titles in a multi-author series.
Title page	Repeats the title and author as printed on the cover or spine, often using typographic elements carried over from either the cover design or from the rest of the book's interior. Title pages may also include the publisher's logo accompanied by the city and/or year of publication.
Copyright page	(Also known as Edition notice) Technical information such as edition dates, copyrights, translations used, and the name and address of the publisher or printer. It usually appears in modern books on the verso of the title page, but in some books is placed at the end (see Back matter).
Dedication	A dedication page is a page in a book that precedes the text, in which the author names the person or people for whom they have written the book.
Epigraph	A phrase, quotation, or poem. The epigraph may serve as a preface, as a summary, as a counter-example, or to link the work to a wider literary canon, either to invite comparison, or to enlist a conventional context.
Table of contents	This is a list of chapter headings and sometimes nested subheadings, together with their respective page numbers. This includes all front matter items listed below, together with chapters in the body matter and back matter. The number of levels of subheadings shown should be limited, so as to keep the contents list short, ideally one page, or possibly a double-page spread. Technical books may include a list of figures and a list of tables. In French language books, the table of contents is often part of the back matter rather than the front matter.
Foreword	Often, a foreword will tell of some interaction between the writer of the foreword and the writer of the story, or a personal reaction and significance the story elicited. A foreword to later editions of a work often describes the work's historical context and explains in what respects the current edition differs from previous ones.
Preface	A preface is generally the author recounting the story of how the book came into being, or how the idea for the book was developed. This is often followed by thanks and acknowledgments to people who were helpful to the author during the time of writing.
Acknowledgments	Sometimes part of the preface rather than a separate section in its own right, or sometimes placed in the back matter rather than the front, it acknowledges those who contributed to the creation of the book.
Introduction	A beginning section which states the purpose and goals of the following writing.
Prologue	Usually present in fiction or narrative nonfiction, the prologue is an opening to the story that establishes the setting and gives background details, often from some earlier or later timeframe that ties into the main one. As such, it is generally considered part of the body in modern book organization (for example, in the Chicago Manual of Style).

=== Body matter (text) ===
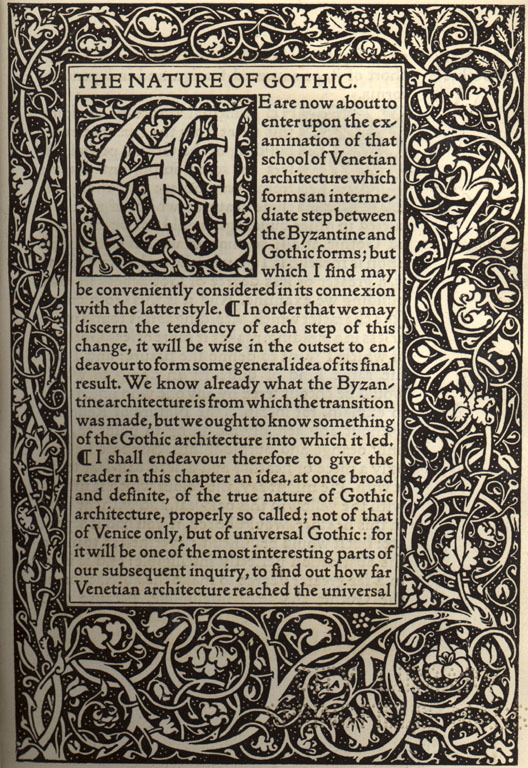
Initial on the opening page of a book printed by the Kelmscott Press

The structure of a work—and especially of its body matter—is often described hierarchically.

Volumes
A set of leaves bound together. Thus each work is either a volume, or is divided into volumes.
Books and parts
Single-volume works account for most of the non-academic consumer market in books. A single volume may embody either a part of a book or the whole of a book; in some works, parts encompass multiple books, while in others, books may consist of multiple parts.
Chapters and sections
A chapter or section may be contained within a part or a book. When both chapters and sections are used in the same work, the sections are more often contained within chapters than the reverse. Chapters and sections may have intertitles, also known as internal titles.
Modules and units
In some books the chapters are grouped into bigger parts, sometimes called modules. The numbering of the chapters can begin again at the start of every module. In educational books, especially, the chapters are often called units.

The first page of the actual text of a book is the opening page, which often incorporates special design features, such as initials. Arabic numbering starts at this first page. If the text is introduced by a second half title or opens with a part title, the half title or part title counts as page one. As in the front matter, page numbers are omitted on blank pages, and are either omitted or a drop folio is used on the opening page of each part and chapter. On pages containing only illustrations or tables, page numbers are usually omitted, except in the case of a long sequence of figures or tables.

The following are two instructive examples:

- The Lord of the Rings has three parts (either in one volume each, or in a single volume), with each part containing two books, each containing, in turn, multiple chapters.
- The Christian Bible (usually bound as a single volume) comprises two "testaments" (which might more typically be described as "parts", and differ in length by a factor of three or four), each containing dozens of books of varying lengths. In turn, each book (except for the shortest) contains multiple chapters, which are traditionally divided (for purposes of citation) into "verses" each containing roughly one independent clause.

=== Back matter (end matter) ===
The back matter, also known as end matter, if used, normally consists of one or more of the following components:

Name	Purpose
Epilogue	This piece of writing at the end of a work of literature or drama is usually used to bring closure to the work.
Afterword	An afterword generally covers the story of how the book came into being, or of how the idea for the book was developed.
Postscript	A postscript (though more typical of a letter) occasionally appears in books as an addendum or afterthought to the main body of the work. It is often abbreviated to 'P.S.'
Appendix or Addendum	This supplemental addition to a given main work may correct errors, explain inconsistencies or otherwise detail or update the information found in the main work.
Glossary	The glossary consists of a set of definitions of words of importance to the work. They are normally alphabetized. The entries may consist of places and characters, which is common for longer works of fiction.
Bibliography	This cites other works consulted when writing the body. It is most common in non-fiction books or research papers.
Index	This list of terms used in the text contains references, often page numbers, to where the terms can be found in the text. Most common in non-fiction books.
Colophon	This brief description may be located at the end of a book or on the verso of the title page. It describes production notes relevant to the edition, such as typeface used, and may include a printer's mark or logotype.
Postface	The postface provides similar information to a preface. The location after the main work is to minimize confusion and to not distract readers.
Author	A brief, single page-long biography of the author, sometimes accompanied by a photograph of them. It is written in the third-person narrative.
Back endpapers	Decorative paper affixed to the inside cover; may have additional uses. (Not numbered, and may not be considered technically part of the back matter or even technically a page at all.)

Arabic numbering continues for the back matter.

== Front cover, spine, and back cover ==
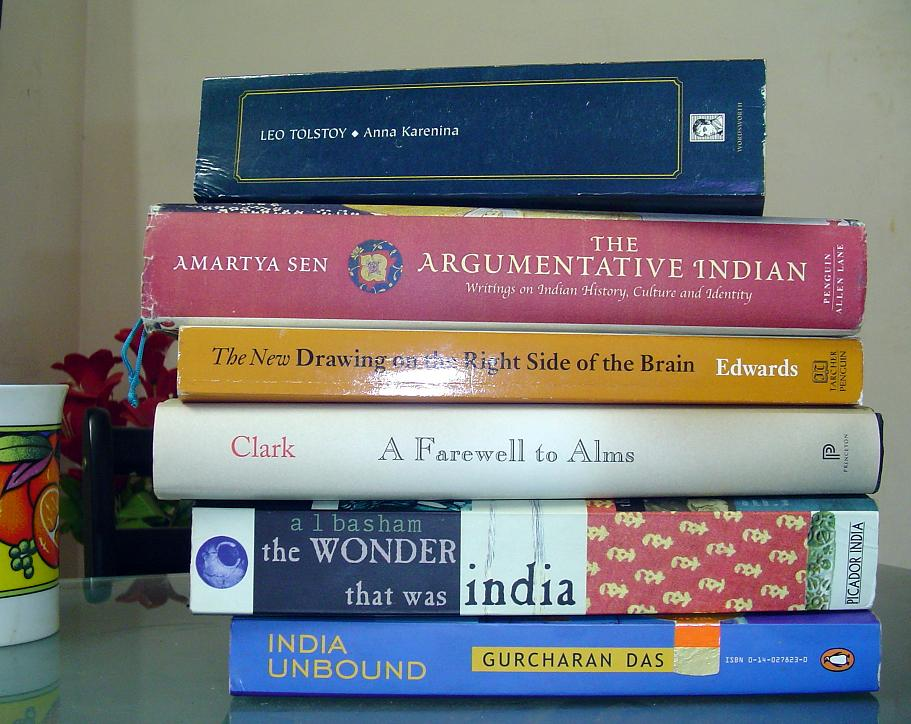
The spine of the book is an important aspect in book design, especially in the cover design. When the books are stacked up or stored in a shelf, the details on the spine is the only visible surface that contains the information about the book. In a book store, it is often the details on the spine that attract the attention first.

The front cover is the front of the book, and is marked appropriately by text or graphics in order to identify it as such (namely as the very beginning of the book). The front cover usually contains at least the title or author, with possibly an appropriate illustration. When the book has a soft or hard cover with dust jacket, the cover yields all or part of its informational function to the dust jacket.

On the inside of the cover page, extending to the facing page is the front endpaper sometimes referred as FEP. The free half of the end paper is called a flyleaf. Traditionally, in hand-bound books, the endpaper was just a sheet of blank or ornamented paper physically masking and reinforcing the connection between the cover and the body of the book. In modern publishing it can be either plain, as in many text-oriented books, or variously ornamented and illustrated in books such as picture books, other children's literature, some arts and craft and hobbyist books, novelty/gift-market and coffee table books, and graphic novels. Elaborate artwork is more expensive than plain paper, but it may be used when expected for the genre, or for an anniversary edition or other special edition of a book in any genre. These books have an audience and traditions of their own, in which the graphic design and immediacy is especially important and publishing tradition and formality are less important.

On the inside of the back cover page, extending from the facing page before it, is the endpaper. Its design matches the front endpaper and, in accordance with it, contains either plain paper or pattern, image etc.

The back cover often contains biographical matter about the author or editor, and quotes from other sources praising the book. It may also contain a summary or description of the book

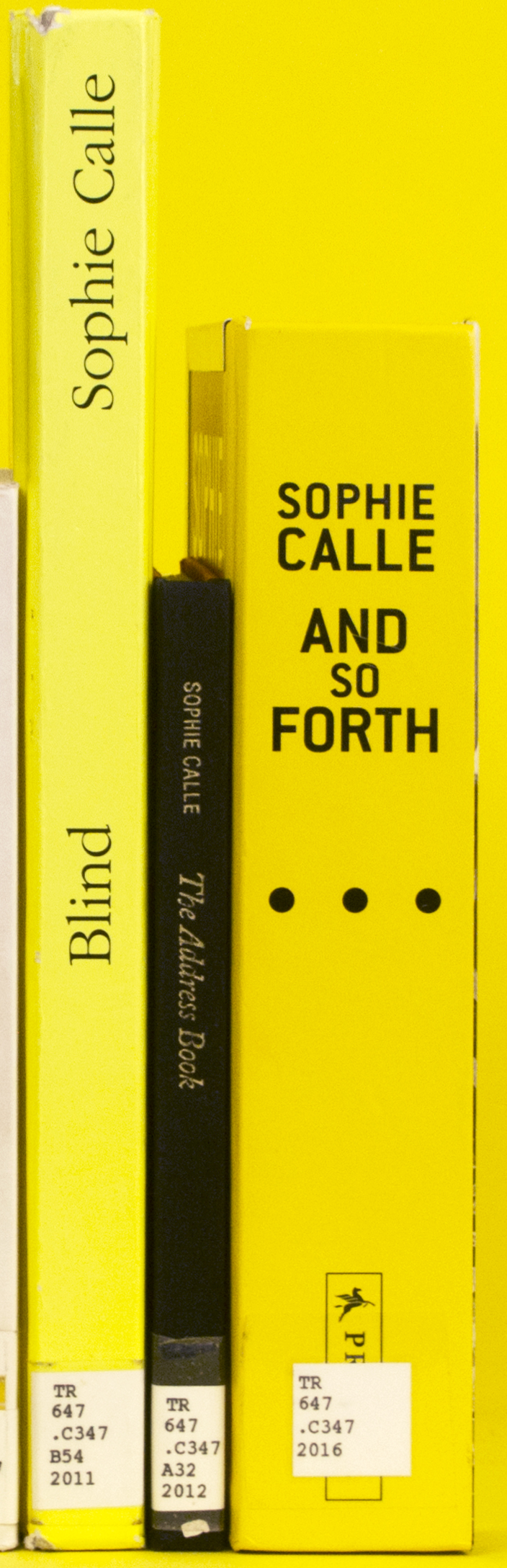
Books with different spine orientations: ascending (left); descending (middle); upright (right)

The spine is the vertical edge of a book as it normally stands on a bookshelf. Early books did not have titles on their spines; rather they were shelved flat with their spines inward and titles written with ink along their fore edges. Modern books display their titles on their spines. The spine usually contains all, or some, of four elements (besides decoration, if any), and in the following order: (1) author, editor, or compiler; (2) title; (3) publisher; and (4) publisher logo.

In languages with Chinese-influenced writing systems, the title is written top-to-bottom. In languages written from left to right, the spine text can be pillar (one letter per line), transverse (text line perpendicular to long edge of spine) and along spine. Conventions differ about the direction in which the title along the spine is rotated:

- Top-to-bottom (descending):

In texts published or printed in the United States, the United Kingdom, the Commonwealth, Scandinavia and the Netherlands, the spine text, when the book is standing upright, runs from the top to the bottom. This means that when the book is lying flat with the front cover upwards, the title is oriented left-to-right on the spine. This practice is reflected in the industry standards ANSI/NISO Z39.41 and ISO 6357., but "... lack of agreement in the matter persisted among English-speaking countries as late as the middle of the twentieth century, when books bound in Britain still tended to have their titles read up the spine ...".

In many continental European countries, where the ascending system has been used in the past, the descending system has been used in recent decades, probably due to the influence of the English-speaking countries, such as Italy, Russia, Poland and elsewhere.

- Bottom-to-top (ascending):

In many continental European and Latin American countries, the spine text, when the book is standing upright, runs from the bottom up, so the title can be read by tilting the head to the left. This allows the reader to read spines of books shelved in alphabetical order in accordance to the usual way left-to-right and top-to-bottom.

== Binding ==
Books are classified under two categories according to the physical nature of their binding. The designation hardcover (or hardback) refers to books with stiff covers, as opposed to flexible ones. The binding of a hardcover book usually includes boards (often made of paperboard) covered in cloth, leather, or other materials. Hard cover books are traditionally the most profitable. Expensive options, such as leather covers, are often available for deluxe editions of classic literature. The binding is usually sewn to the pages using string stitching.

A less expensive binding method is that used for paperback books (sometimes called softback or softcover). Most paperbacks are bound with paper or light cardboard, though other materials (such as plastic) are used. The covers are flexible and usually bound to the pages using glue (perfect binding). Some small paperback books are sub-classified as pocketbooks. These paperbacks are smaller than usual—small enough to barely fit into a pocket (especially the back pocket of one's trousers). However, this capacity to fit into a pocket diminishes with increasing number of pages and increasing thickness of the book. Such a book may still be designated as a pocketbook.

== Other features ==
Other design features may be added, especially for deluxe editions. Just as publishers sell hardcover and paperback editions for the same book, deluxe editions may be sold alongside regular editions. The additional features may require extra printing time, sometimes adding a week or two to the production timeline, and they are not necessarily more profitable. However, they can appeal strongly to an existing fanbase, and features of a book design that show well in video can help a book go viral.

Some books such as Bibles or dictionaries may have a thumb index to help find material quickly.

Gold leaf may also be applied to the edges of the pages, so that when closed, the side, top, and bottom of the book have a golden color. On some books, a design may be printed on the edges, or marbling or a simple colour applied. Some artist's books go even further, by using fore-edge painting. Features such as these colored page edges, or others such as using metallic foil elements, reversible dust jackets, or affixing a ribbon for a bookmark, are often seen in special editions or when the publisher wants to signal that the book is a collectible.

Pop-up elements and fold-out pages may be used to add dimensions to the page in different ways.

Children's books commonly incorporate a wide array of design features built into the fabric of the book. Some books for preschoolers include textured fabric, plastic or other materials. Die-cut techniques in the work of Eric Carle are one example. Clear or reflective surfaces, flaps, textiles, and scratch-and-sniff are other possible features.

== Page spread ==
Page spread with J. A. van de Graaf's construction of classical text area (print space) and margin proportions

A basic unit in book design is the page spread. The left page and right page (called verso and recto respectively, in left-to-right language books) are of the same size and aspect ratio, and are centered on the gutter where they are bound together at the spine.

The design of each individual page, on the other hand, is governed by the canons of page construction.

The possible layout of the sets of letters of the alphabet, or words, on a page is determined by the so-called print space, and is also an element in the design of the page of the book. There must be sufficient space at the spine of the book if the text is to be visible. On the other hand, the other three margins of the page, which frame the book, are made of the appropriate size for both practical and aesthetic reasons.

=== Print space ===
The print space or type area determines the effective area on the paper of a book, journal or other press work. The print space is limited by the surrounding borders, or in other words the gutters outside the printed area.

== See also ==
- Galley proof
- Imprint
- Letterpress
- Page (paper)
- Page numbering
- Recto and verso
- Visual design

Other types of books

- Interactive children's book
- Interactive fiction
- Pop-up book
