= Standard page =

Standard page is a unit of information measurement for the amount of text in publishing. A standard page is approximately equal to a single page of text typed on a typewriter.

Despite the name, the unit is not formally standardized, and various entities use various standards for a standard page length:

- 1,875 characters
- 1,800 characters
- 1,680 characters
- 1,500 characters, excluding spaces
- 1,450 characters
- 1,230 characters, excluding spaces

Here, unless otherwise noted, characters include letters, punctuation and spaces.
