= Recto and verso =

"Front" and "back" sides of a leaf of paper

Left-to-right language books (e.g. books in Western languages): recto is the front page, verso is the back page. In this picture, the recto page shown is of the following leaf in a book and hence comes next to the verso of the previous leaf.

Right-to-left language books: recto is the front page, verso is the back page (vertical Chinese, vertical Japanese, Arabic-based scripts, or Hebrew). In this picture, the recto page shown is of the following leaf in a book and hence comes next to the verso of the previous leaf.

Recto is the "right" or "front" side and verso is the "left" or "back" side when text is written or printed on a leaf of paper (folium) in a bound item such as a codex, book, broadsheet, or pamphlet.

In the case of a single unbound sheet of paper or other material, such as a drawing or watercolour painting, the recto is the side with the main image or writing, and the verso the back of this. In a letter or other double-sided text document, the recto is the first page, and the verso the continuation on the back.

In double-sided printing, each leaf has two pages – front and back. In modern books, the physical sheets of paper are stacked and folded in half, producing two leaves and four pages for each sheet. For example, the outer sheet in a 16-page book will have one leaf with pages 1 (recto) and 2 (verso), and another leaf with pages 15 (recto) and 16 (verso). Pages 1 and 16, for example, are printed on the same side of the physical sheet of paper, combining recto and verso sides of different leaves. The number of pages in a book using this binding technique must thus be a multiple of four, and the number of leaves must be a multiple of two, but unused pages are typically left unnumbered and uncounted. A sheet folded in this manner is known as a folio, a word also used for a book or pamphlet made with this technique.

Looseleaf paper consists of unbound leaves. Sometimes single-sided or blank leaves are used for numbering or counting and abbreviated "l." instead of "p." for the number of pages.

== Etymology ==
The terms are shortened from Latin: rēctō foliō and versō foliō (which translate as "on the right side of the leaf" and "on the back side of the leaf"). The two opposite pages themselves are called folium rēctum and folium versum in Latin, and the ablative rēctō, versō already imply that the text on the page (and not the physical page itself) are referred to.

== Usage ==
=== Latin script ===
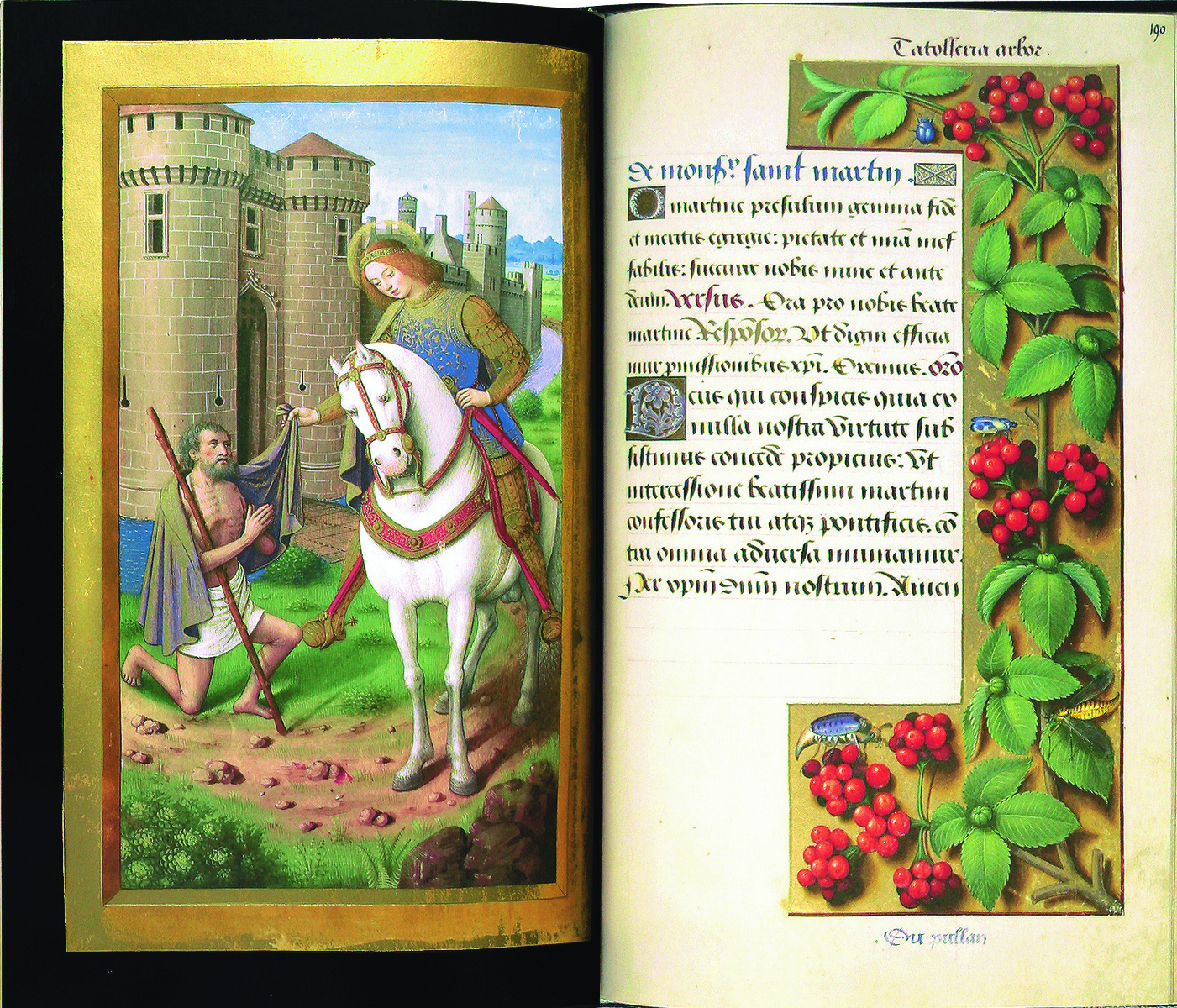
Grandes Heures of Anne of Brittany, f. 189v-190r

In codicology, each physical sheet (folium, abbreviated fol. or f.) of a manuscript is numbered, and the sides are referred to as folium rēctum and folium versum, abbreviated as r and v respectively. Editions of manuscripts will thus mark the position of text in the original manuscript in the form fol. 1r, sometimes with the r and v in superscript, as in 1^{r}, or with a superscript o indicating the ablative rēctō foliō, versō, as in 1r^{o}. This terminology has been standard since the beginnings of modern codicology in the 17th century.

In 2011, Martyn Lyons argued that the term rēctum "right, correct, proper" for the front side of the leaf derives from the use of papyrus in late antiquity, as a different grain ran across each side, and only one side was suitable to be written on, so that usually papyrus would carry writing only on the "correct", smooth side (and just in exceptional cases would there be writing on the reverse side of the leaf).

The terms "recto" and "verso" are also used in the codicology of manuscripts written in right-to-left scripts, like Syriac, Arabic and Hebrew. However, as these scripts are written in the other direction to the scripts witnessed in European codices, the recto page is to the left while the verso is to the right. The reading order of each folio remains first verso, then recto, regardless of writing direction.

The terms are carried over into printing; recto-verso is the norm for printed books but was an important advantage of the printing press over the much older Asian woodblock printing method, which printed by rubbing from behind the page being printed, and so could only print on one side of a piece of paper. The distinction between recto and verso can be convenient in the annotation of scholarly books, particularly in bilingual edition translations.

The "recto" and "verso" terms can also be employed for the front and back of a one-sheet artwork, particularly in drawing. A recto-verso drawing is a sheet with drawings on both sides, for example in a sketchbook—although usually in these cases there is no obvious primary side. Some works are planned to exploit being on two sides of the same piece of paper, but usually the works are not intended to be considered together. Paper was relatively expensive in the past; good drawing paper still is much more expensive than normal paper.

By book publishing convention, the first page of a book, and sometimes of each section and chapter of a book, is a recto page, and hence all recto pages will have odd numbers and all verso pages will have even numbers.

In many early printed books or incunables (e.g. João de Barros's Décadas da Ásia), it is the folia ("leaves") rather than the pages, that are numbered, a term called foliation, which is opposed to pagination. Thus, each folium carries a consecutive number on its recto side, while on the verso side there is no number. This was also very common in e.g. internal company reports in the 20th century, before double-sided printers became commonplace in offices. In early 20th century British diary culture, a hybridisation between the two forms was popular, where pages were numbered sequentially (pagination), however the page number was only displayed on the verso page, imitating foliation and avoiding placing a number on the recto page which introduced a new chapter, which traditionally did not display a number. These diaries were often hand-numbered, and the form is very rarely used for printed books.

=== Cyrillic script ===
Hypatian Codex, folio 3 verso, pencil-marked "3 об" in the top left corner. At Izbornyk, this is written as "/л.3об./".

In Cyrillic script, the letters "лл" and "об." are abbreviations used in a similar way to recto and verso.

- recto is "лл.", the abbreviation for "лицевая сторона" litsevaja storona (Russian) or "лицьова сторона" lytsjova storona (Ukrainian), meaning "front side" or "face side".
- verso is, "об.", the abbreviation for "оборотная сторона" oborotnaja storona (Russian) or "обернена сторона" obernena storona (Ukrainian), meaning "reverse side" or "back side".

Therefore, when referring to the front and back of a page in Cyrillic documents, "лл." would correspond to recto (front), and "об." would correspond to verso (back, reverse). This applies to pencil-marked folios of medieval and early modern manuscripts, such as the Hypatian Codex, in Old East Slavic, Old Church Slavonic, Ruthenian, or the (early) modern East Slavic languages and some South Slavic languages. It may also be used in modern critical editions of those manuscripts, such as by the Complete Collection of Rus' Chronicles (PSRL), or its digitised editions on websites such as Izbornyk in Ukraine, or the National Library of Russia's Laurentian Codex Project. For example, when the Izbornyk edition of the Hypatian Codex reads "/л.3об./", that means "folio 3, reverse side" (об.; verso). This is the exact spot where the text of the previous page, folio 3 recto (/л.3/), ends and that of folio 3 verso begins.

Early scholars of East Slavic manuscripts such as the Supraśl Manuscript used ink to mark page numbers, while later researchers preferred to use pencils. The page numbers would be helpful for themselves or colleagues to keep track of the manuscript's structure, and to make notes referring to specific places in the text. A major issue with using ink, however, was that the numbering could be wrong, and thus a scholar could accidentally permanently damage a highly valuable manuscript by adding incorrect markings in unerasable ink. For this reason, later researchers preferred to mark page numbers with pencils, which could be easily corrected with an eraser (rubber) without doing significant damage to the precious archival materials.

== See also ==
- Book design
- Obverse and reverse in coins
- Page spread
- Page (paper)
