= Boxout =

A boxout is an approximately square-shaped design element that contains text or graphics separate from the main body of text or graphics on the page. Unlike a sidebar, a boxout does not need to be a vertical rectangle along one edge of the page.

Boxouts are very commonly used in magazines, but may also be seen in books and on web pages. The function of a boxout is primarily to hold related information separate from the main essay while retaining some degree of connection. As such, boxouts will often be seen containing things like glossaries and author biographies. On web pages they frequently contain hyperlinks to related articles. In terms of design, boxouts help to break up the page and make it more visually interesting.

== See also ==
- Pull quote
- Sidebar
