= Lunellum =

Crescent-shaped knife for hides

A lunellum is a crescent-shaped knife that was used in medieval times to prepare parchment. The word is derived from the Latin luna (moon) because of its shape. The tool is used for the purpose of scraping off (scudding) remaining tissue from a stretched animal skin that was previously treated, and has its shape to prevent its cutting through the skin.
