= Page numbering =

Numbering of a book or document

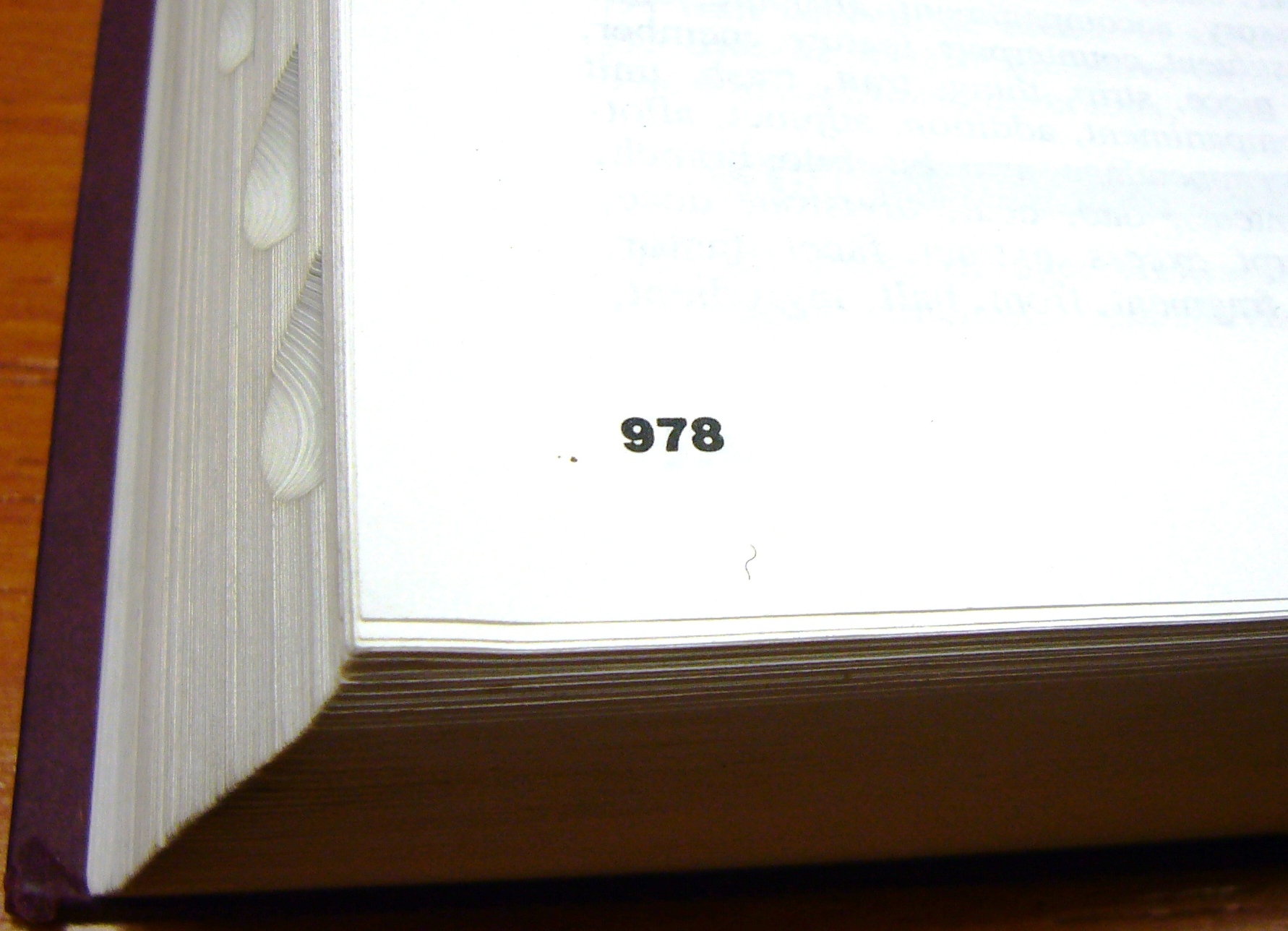
Page number in a book

Page numbering is the process of applying a sequence of numbers (or letters, or Roman numerals) to the pages of a book or other document. The number itself, which may appear in various places on the page, can be referred to as a page number or as a folio. Like other numbering schemes such as chapter numbering, page numbers allow the citation of a particular page of the numbered document and facilitates to the reader to find specific parts of the document and to know the size of the complete text (by checking the number of the last page).

== Numbering conventions ==
Even numbers usually appear on verso (left-hand) pages, while odd numbers appear on recto (right-hand) pages. In the printing industry, in cases where odd numbers appear on verso pages and even numbers on recto pages, this is referred to as non-traditional folios (in the past, it had been referred to as Chinese folios, however this term has fallen out of favor in recent years).

In books, some pages, known as blind folios, of the front matter and back matter are numbered but the numbers are not printed. Publishers are not consistent about how they number the pages of their books. Some publishers stick with the default numbering of the tool they are using, which is typically to number the first page of the front matter as 1 and all pages after that in a consecutive order. When publishers wish to distinguish between the front matter and the body, the initial title pages are blind folios, the front matter is numbered using lower-case Roman numerals (i, ii, iii...) and the first page of the body or main content begins with 1. The title page of the body, if present, is a blind folio; similarly, any section title pages (e.g., when the body is broken into multiple parts), are blind folios. The first page of chapter one would then be numbered as page 3.

The sixteenth edition of the Chicago Manual of Style calls for the beginning of the text to begin with the Arabic number 1, while the front matter that precedes it is to be numbered with lower-case Roman numerals. If the front matter is extensive and a second half-title page is included, it is to be numbered as page 1 and its verso as page 2. If a part title is included, it is to be included in the same numbering as the text. Page numbers do not appear on part titles.

Most citation systems call for the identification of the page number from which a quote or point is drawn. For example, such usage is specified in their citation formats of both the Chicago Manual of Style, and The Bluebook.

Some printed versions of the Christian Bible, such as the New Revised Standard Version and the Jerusalem Bible, recommence page numbering with page 1 at the start of the New Testament section, which follows directly after the Old Testament.

== Numbering by chapter ==
Guidelines for technical manuals, especially loose bound manuals expected to be updated, often recommend numbering pages by chapter. When numbering by chapter, page "3-2" is the second page of chapter 3, page "A-3" is the third page of Appendix A.

Larger newspapers have page "numbers" that begin with a letter -- page "B3" is the third page of the second section.

== Unique numbering schemes ==
In the book Humble Pi by mathematics communicator and YouTuber Matt Parker, the book uses a page numbering scheme where the pages count backward from 314 to 0, referencing the approximation of 3.14 for the mathematical constant pi (π).

== Electronic documents ==
E-books and other electronic documents published in a non-reflowable format such as PDF are normally paginated and numbered in the same way as their printed counterparts.

While reading devices for reflowable documents such as EPUB e-books may display page numbers, these numbers change from device to device depending on factors such as the size of the display and the selected font size. This makes them unsuitable for citation purposes. To remedy this problem, Amazon Kindle e-books contain what are called "location numbers", that is, numbers in the margin of the electronic text that indicate where the corresponding page begins in the printed version of the book.

== Manuscripts ==
In codicology, each physical sheet (folium, abbreviated fol. or f.) of a manuscript is numbered and the sides are referred to as folium rectum and folium versum, abbreviated as r and v respectively. This results in designations like 5r (the front side of the fifth sheet) and 8v (the back side of the eighth sheet).

== See also ==
- Book design
- Blank page
- Column number
- Index (publishing)
