= Biblioteca della Società Storica Subalpina =

Italian historical anthology of data from the Savoyard states

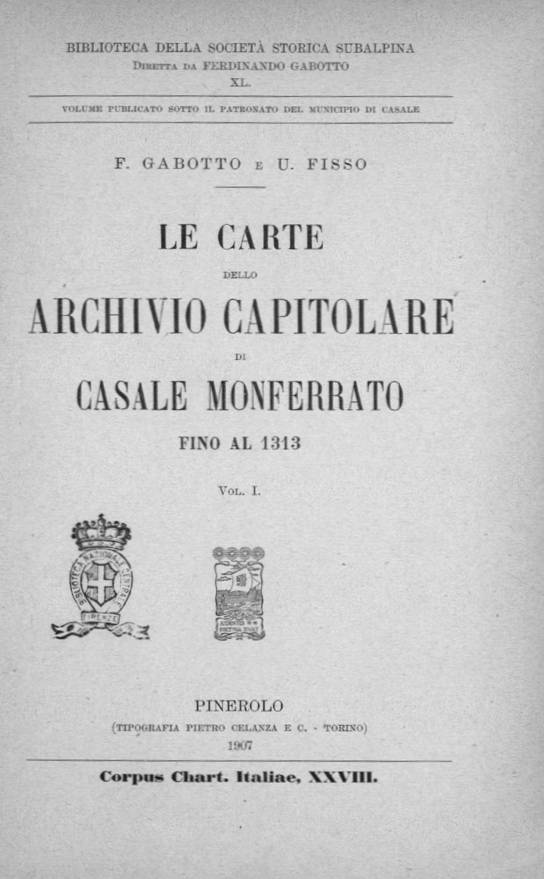
Title page of volume 40, 1907

Biblioteca della Società Storica Subalpina (abbreviated as the BSSS) is an academic anthology of historical records and primary sources that include monographic studies and documentary sources about the Savoyard states. The records are chronicled across hundreds of volumes which are themselves split into five broad groups: Cartari (Corpus Chartarum Italiae), Memorie, Miscellanea, Regesti, and Testi.

The initiative was launched in 1899 by the Turin historian Ferdinando Gabotto within the Deputazione Subalpina di storia patria, which he had founded three years earlier. Since 1956, it has been known as the 'Biblioteca Storica Subalpina', abbreviated as the BSS.

The publications from the early decades, corresponding to the first hundred volumes, are largely digitized and made freely available through the Biblioteca europea di informazione e cultura (European Library of Information and Culture) platform, in the section Medieval and Modern European Law.

== History ==
=== Background ===
The idea of making documentary sources for historical studies accessible and user-friendly was not new. In the 18th century, the Modenese Ludovico Antonio Muratori compiled the famous Rerum Italicarum Scriptores and Antiquitates Italicae Medii Aevi, but largely overlooked Piedmont. In 1833, King Charles Albert established the Deputazione Subalpina di storia patria, whose series Historiae Patriae Monumenta aimed to fill Muratori's gap; however, for a long time, its publications neglected many documents and cartularies, especially those from municipal and private archives.

The Royal Deputation's contribution to source publication was heavily influenced by the perception of these sources until the 19th century: documentary collections were seen as mere containers of material, relevant only for the facts they recorded. Thus, it was logical to select the most important elements at the user's discretion, often chronologically reorganized for ease of consultation. The historical interest in the documentary collections themselves, appreciable only in their integrity and original form, was still far from being recognized.

=== Foundation and Gabotto era ===
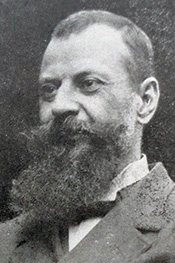
Ferdinando Gabotto, creator of the series

During the first congress of the Subalpine Historical Society, held in Cuneo in 1898, the issue resurfaced, and there was a call to undertake the systematic publication of regional documentary sources, a true "cartulary of the ancient mainland states". Over time, this activity became the Society's primary objective, a true mission, alongside the dissemination of studies based on it, published in the Bollettino storico-bibliografico subalpino. Ferdinando Gabotto, supported by a group of enthusiastic associates, realized the proposal in 1899 by launching the series. Gabotto also secured financial support from credit institutions and local administrations, both provincial and municipal, as well as from prominent figures such as members of the royal family and nobility. The series' significance was immediately evident and recognized even abroad.

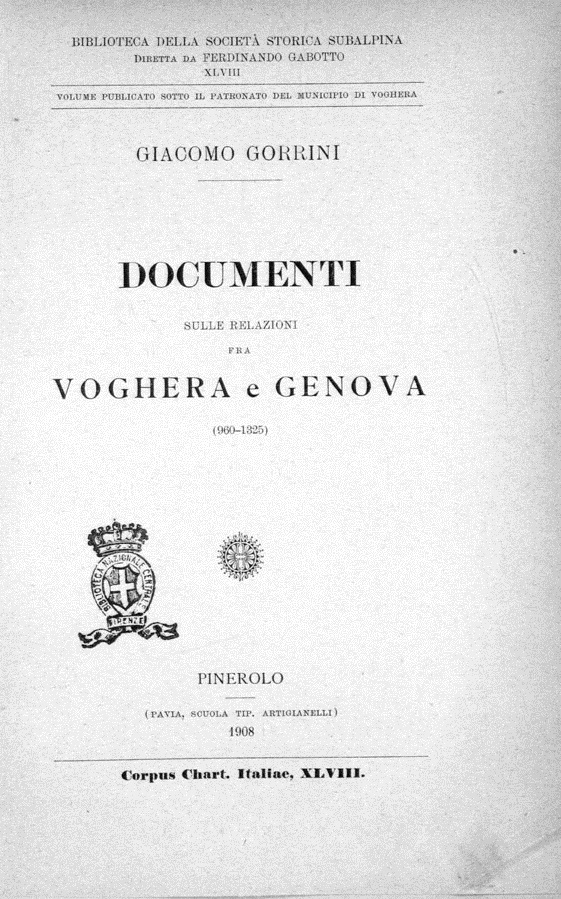
Top of the title page during the direction of Ferdinando Gabotto, from 1899 to 1918

From the outset, Gabotto advocated a highly pragmatic editorial selection policy, based on the strong preparatory value of the publications for the congresses: since local administrations were generally willing to fund works concerning them, choices were oriented toward themes related to future congress venues, creating a virtuous cycle that brought prestige to the hosting venue while fostering the Society's growth and recognition. This policy was one of the reasons why, in the early years, the publication of regional cartularies was favored, i.e., monographs on a single area, due to the greater ease of securing funding compared to mixed cartularies.

The mechanism based on promoting publications in conjunction with annual congresses was quickly consolidated, simultaneously resolving the issue of funding. Thus, the geographical progression of the first ten volumes faithfully reflected the correspondence with the respective congress venues (Pinerolo in 1899, Ivrea in 1900, Saluzzo in 1901). However, by 1902, the Society's resources proved insufficient to sustain the intense pace of work required: editions were postponed year after year, losing the correspondence between themes and congress venues, and the list of works in preparation published in the Bollettino underwent frequent changes in numbering, titles, and editors, to the point that in 1909 Gabotto deemed it necessary to publicly declare that this list should be considered a statement of intent.

Gabotto's personal archive provides numerous details on the Society's daily life. Among various points of interest, the relationship with printers stands out, characterized by frequent disputes: on one hand, the series director, extremely demanding and perpetually dissatisfied with the results and high costs, accused printers of incompetence and lack of professionalism; on the other hand, printers, struggling with his pressing demands, sometimes refused to take on BSSS editions due to low profits and the slow, laborious typesetting. Gabotto even considered bypassing printers and directly hiring the necessary workers, but Carlo Patrucco managed to dissuade him.

Between 1914 and 1915, Gabotto's worsening health (a dominant figure within the Society, almost identified with it) and Italy's entry into war halted the itinerant congresses, and the series' publications significantly slowed.

In 1918, the city indicated on the title page changed from Pinerolo to Turin.

=== Post-World War I ===
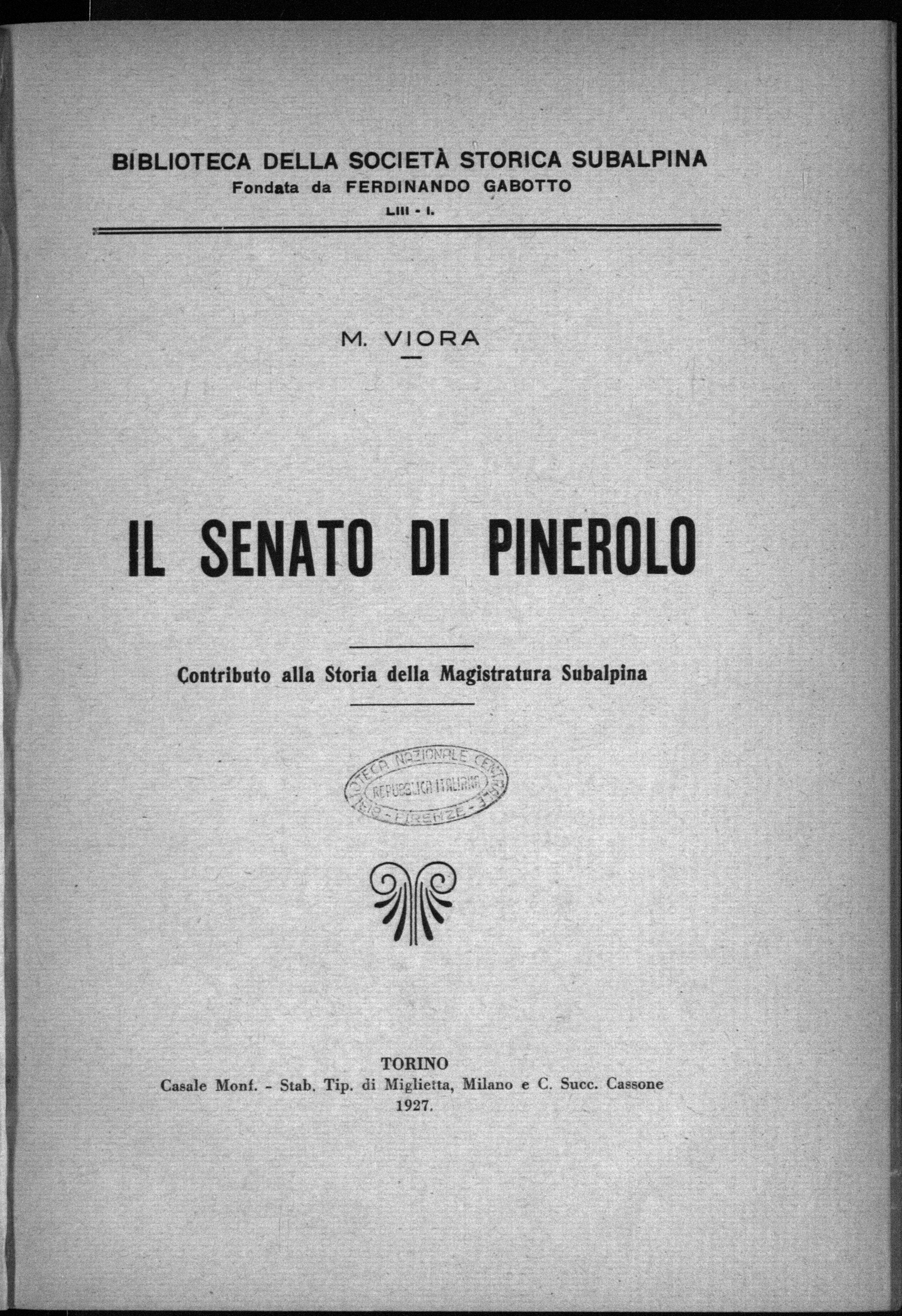
Top of the title page during the direction of Armando Tallone, from 1919 to 1935

Ferdinando Gabotto died in November 1918, and the Society's activities came to a complete halt until the following April, when a new statute was drafted, and the board of directors was renewed, with Armando Tallone as the series director. In this context, the new series of the collection was launched, maintaining the numbering but updating the title page: the wording "directed by Ferdinando Gabotto" was changed to "founded by Ferdinando Gabotto".

During Carlo Patrucco's presidency, in 1924, the itinerant congresses resumed, with Vercelli as the first hosting venue. On this occasion, the publication of municipal documentary sources began, with the 13th-century libri iurium of the same Eusebian city.

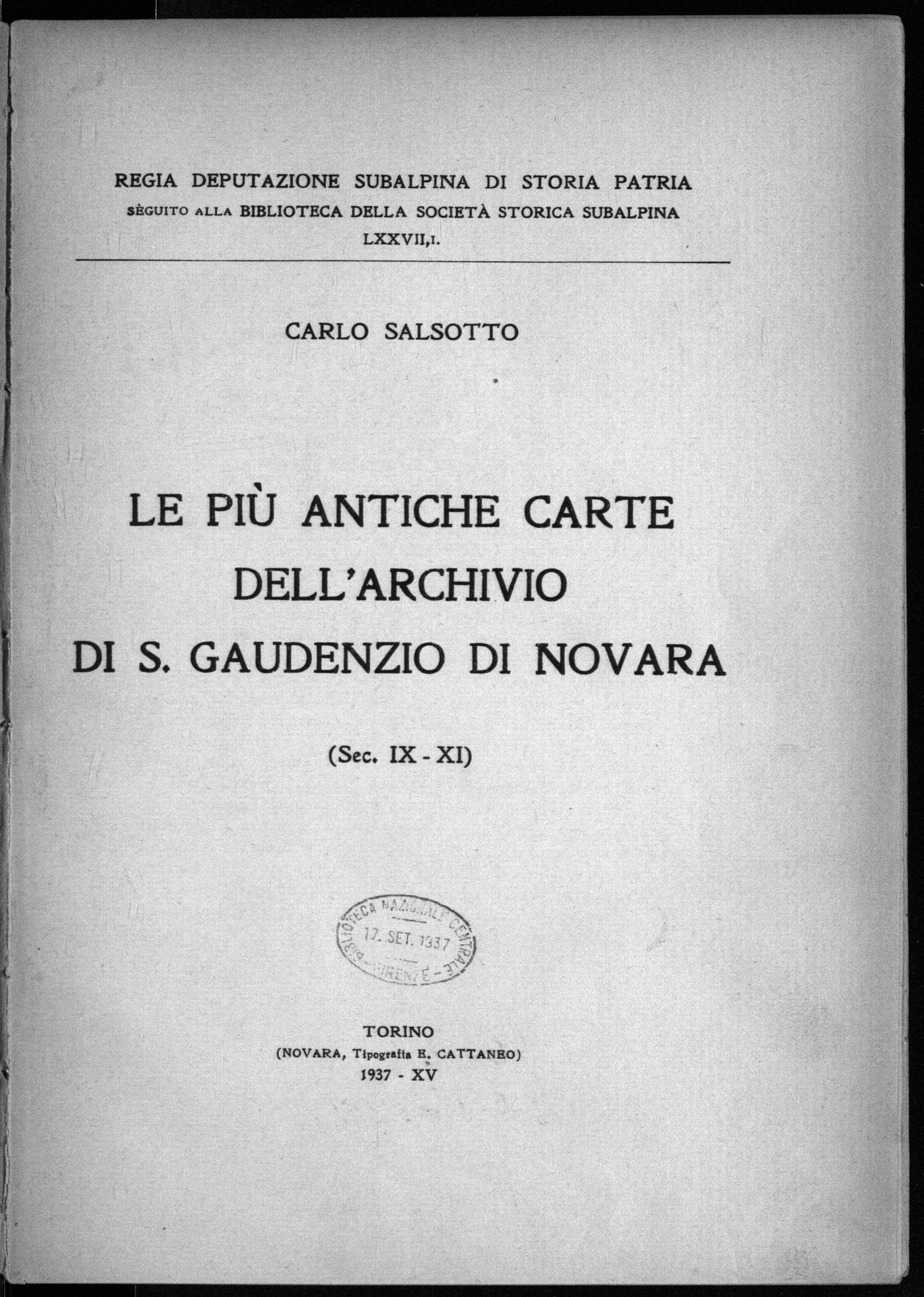
Top of the title page after the merger of the Subalpine Historical Society into the Regia Deputazione Subalpina di Storia Patria, from 1935

From 1935, following the merger of the Subalpine Historical Society into the Royal Subalpine Deputation for Homeland History, willed by President Cesare Maria De Vecchi, the series' publications no longer bore the Society's name on the title page, replaced by the wording "Regia Deputazione Subalpina di Storia Patria - Continuation of the Biblioteca della Società Storica Subalpina". The volume numbering was maintained.

With the publication of volume 175 in 1943 (Cesare Maria De Vecchi, Le carte di Giovanni Lanza, XI - Appendice e indici), the catastrophe of World War II led to the suspension of the series.

=== Post-World War II ===
In the early post-war years, the Deputation faced various practical problems, such as rebuilding its headquarters, library, and book collections, alongside more specific issues related to budgeting and drafting the new statute (1949). Not least among the issues, the war had caused the "collapse of that synergy of cultural institutions, local administrations, and individuals on which any major publishing project depends". The series' resumption was thus delayed until 1952, with the publication of volume 176 by Giuseppe Barelli, Statuti e documenti di Carrù - Statuti e "Liber franchisiarum et libertatum" di Dogliani.

In those years, the series was at serious risk of closure: inherited from the Subalpine Historical Society, it was seen as a competitor to the Historiae Patriae Monumenta, the Deputation's flagship series since its foundation; moreover, the Deputation's dire economic situation led to allocating limited resources to select projects. Confirming this, the BSSS was not included among the Deputation's official publications in the 1949 statute, unlike the Bollettino storico-bibliografico subalpino. However, internal disagreements within the Deputation about the role of the BSSS allowed it to be maintained and gradually perceived as a proper publication of the Deputation, no longer an unwieldy legacy of the Subalpine Historical Society. Notably, in the volumes published in the early 1950s, the wording "Continuation of the Biblioteca della Società Storica Subalpina" was removed from the title page and relegated to the guard page preceding it.

=== Revival ===
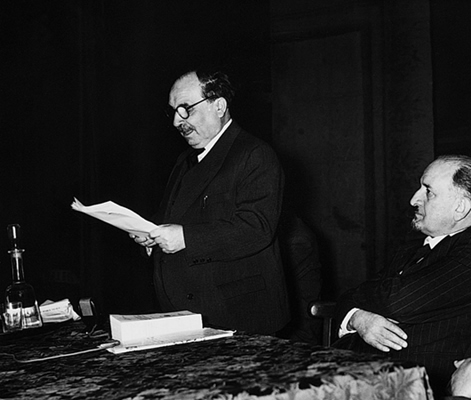
Francesco Cognasso, supporter of the series in the post-World War II period

The situation changed in 1954 with the appointment of Francesco Cognasso, previously a member of the Subalpine Historical Society, as president of the Deputation. During his tenure, scientific activities resumed at full capacity, the centrality of documentary editions was reaffirmed, the itinerant congresses of the Gabotto era were restarted, and the BSSS was revitalized, considered from that moment a "debt of honor toward the Subalpine Historical Society". In this context, in 1956, the series adopted its current name, Biblioteca Storica Subalpina (abbreviated as BSS)..

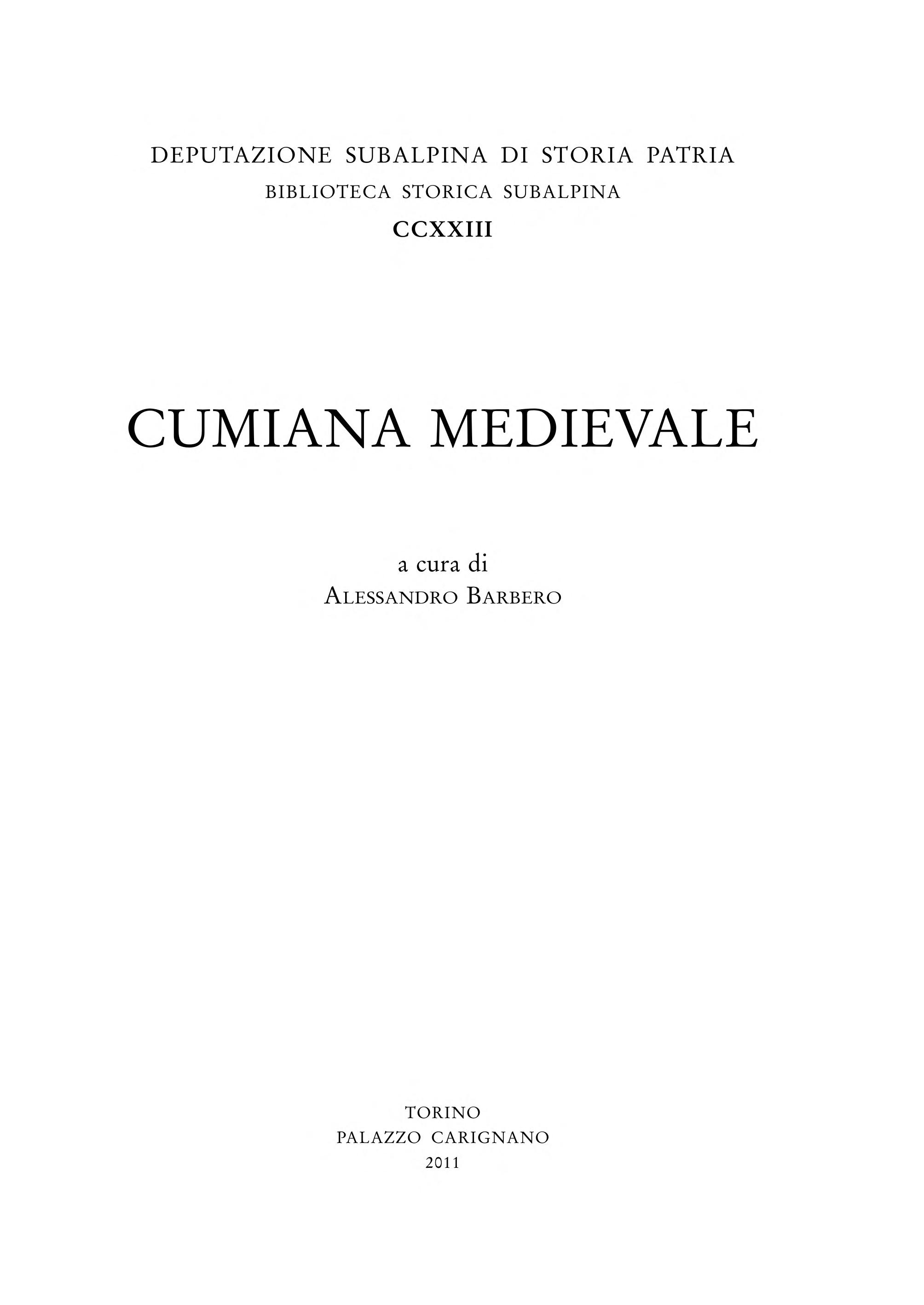
Top of the title page after the renaming of the series in 1956

However, the pace of publications was far from that of the early decades, mainly for financial reasons: the series heavily relied on local contributions, but administrations were no longer as prompt as before; publication costs were also higher than those of study series, especially given the very limited sales volume

== Sources ==
The Subalpine Historical Society established clear criteria for including documentary sources in the series. However, in the preface to the first volume, Gabotto emphasized that editors would have full discretion in compiling the works.

=== Temporal limits ===
The temporal selection criteria for sources to be included in the series were established at the Saluzzo congress in 1901.

Like the Subalpine Deputation for Homeland History, the year 1300 (sometimes 1313) was chosen as the upper temporal limit, despite heated discussions lamenting the potential exclusion of smaller municipal archives. Several reasons supported this: after this date, documents increase significantly, often losing importance; the death of Henry VII and the downsizing of the two major contending medieval powers (the Papal States and the Holy Roman Empire) mark a significant watershed for Subalpine history; in those years, 1313 was increasingly considered the end of the Middle Ages by scholars.

At the same meeting, it was decided to publish sources up to 1200 in their entirety, as they were older and less numerous; documents up to 1300/1313 would be published systematically but with greater flexibility; for later sources, regests would suffice.

This temporal criterion led to a preference for ecclesiastical documentary sources, which are older than municipal ones.

=== Geographical limits ===
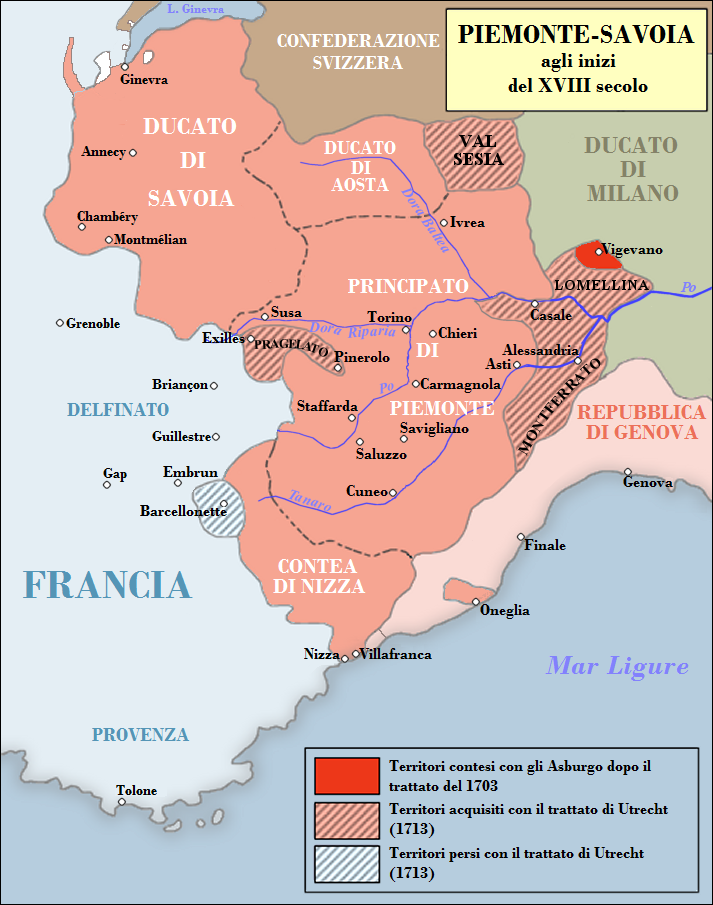
An approximation of the geographical limits of the BSSS

At the second congress held in Pinerolo in 1899, the geographical scope of the Society's activities was discussed. The main doubt concerned the eastern Piedmontese area (Novara, Casale Monferrato, Tortona, and Alessandria), perceived as not entirely Piedmontese due to its historical developments. It was thus decided to base the scope on the term subalpine, which allowed for expansion beyond the narrow and somewhat vague concept of Piedmont, including the eastern territories up to the Lomellina and Oltrepò Pavese and south to Liguria.

On the occasion of the merger into the Royal Subalpine Deputation for Homeland History in 1935, the scope was redefined as "Savoyard States, with particular regard to the provinces of Alessandria, Aosta, Asti, Cuneo, Novara, Turin, and Vercelli".

The 1949 statute reconsidered the geographical scope, primarily including Piedmont and the Aosta Valley, with the possibility of extending to all territories within the sphere of influence of the Savoyard states.

=== Content management ===
Following the principles of scholars such as Benedetto Baudi di Vesme and Cornelio Desimoni, Gabotto immediately advocated for complete adherence to the format, order, duplications, spelling, and punctuation of the originals in the series, as historical information was also embedded in their form. To address the resulting consultation difficulties, appropriate indexes would accompany the sources.

After Gabotto's death, in 1924, the series director Armando Tallone relaxed the content management criteria, aligning them with those of the Italian Historical Institute, characterized by greater flexibility in rendering spelling and punctuation.

Due to the dissatisfaction among scholars caused by the previous decision, in 1934, the editorial guidelines were revised, restoring scrupulous adherence to the originals. The only exception, advocated by Tallone himself, concerned the handling of duplicates, which could be relegated to an appendix.

== Volumes ==
Since there is no comprehensive list of the volumes in the series available online, below is a list of external links to digitized versions, where available.

N.	Title	Editors	Series	Year
1	Studi pinerolesi	B. Baudi di Vesme, F. Gabotto, D. Carutti, E. Durando, C. Demo, C. Patrucco	Memorie I	1899
2	Cartario di Pinerolo fino all'anno 1300	F. Gabotto	Cartari I	1899
2	Il gruppo dei diplomi adelaidini in favore dell'abbazia di Pinerolo	C. Cipolla	Cartari I	1899
3/1	Cartario dell'abazia di Cavour	B. Baudi di Vesme, E. Durando, F. Gabotto	Cartari III/I	1900
3/2	Carte inedite o sparse dei signori e luoghi del Pinerolese fino al 1300	B. Baudi di Vesme, E. Durando, F. Gabotto	Cartari III/II	1912
3/3	Index locorum et personarum	C. Demo		1912
4	Eporediensia	C. Nigra, G. De Jordanis, F. Gabotto, S. Cordero di Pamparato	Memorie II	1900
5	Le carte dell'archivio vescovile di Ivrea fino al 1313, I	F. Gabotto	Cartari III	1900
5	Indici	P. Massia, G. Borghezio		1930
6	Le carte dell'archivio vescovile di Ivrea fino al 1313, II	F. Gabotto	Cartari IV	1900
6	Le bolle pontificie dei registri vaticani relative ad Ivrea	F. Gabotto	Cartari IV	1900
6	Regesto del «libro del comune» d'Ivrea	F. Gabotto	Cartari IV	1900
6	Indici	P. Massia, G. Borghezio		1930
7	Studi eporediesi	B. Baudi di Vesme, E. Durando, A. Tallone, C. Patrucco	Memorie III	1900
8	Documenti dell'archivio comunale di Vercelli relativi ad Ivrea	G. Colombo	Cartari V	1901
8	Indici	P. Massia, G. Borghezio		1930
9	Le carte dell'archivio capitolare d'Ivrea fino al 1230, con una scelta delle più notevoli dal 1231 al 1313	E. Durando	Cartari VI	1902
9	Le carte dell'abazia di Santo Stefano d'Ivrea fino al 1230, con una scelta delle più notevoli dal 1231 al 1313	F. Savio, G. Barelli	Cartari VI	1902

N.	Title	Editors	Series	Year
10	Studi saluzzesi	D. Carutti, G. Barelli, C. Patrucco, S. e F. Pivano, F. Savio, O. Roggiero, G. Colombo, A. Tallone	Memorie IV	1901
11	Cartario dell'abazia di Staffarda, I	F. Gabotto, G. Roberti, D. Chiattone	Cartari VII	1901
12	Cartario dell'abazia di Staffarda fino al 1313, II	F. Gabotto, G. Roberti, D. Chiattone	Cartari VIII	1901
12	Documenti di Scarnafigi	G. Colombo	Cartari VIII	1901
12	Index locorum et personarum	A. Leone	Cartari VIII	1901
13	Cartario dell'abazia di Rifreddo fino all'anno 1300	S. Pivano	Cartari IX	1902
14	Cartario dell'abazia di Casanova fino all'anno 1313	A. Tallone	Cartari X	1903
15	Miscellanea saluzzese	F. Gabotto, C. F. Savio, E. Durando, C. Patrucco, D. Chiattone	Memorie V	1902
16	Regesto dei marchesi di Saluzzo (1091–1340)	A. Tallone	Regesti I	1906
17	Miscellanea valdostana	C. Patrucco, F. Alessio, S. Pivano, G. Battaglino, A. Colombo, F. Gabotto, G. Carbonelli	Memorie VI	1903
18	Asti e la politica sabauda in Italia al tempo di Guglielmo Ventura secondo nuovi documenti	F. Gabotto	Memorie VII	1903
19/1	Rivoluzione, repubblica e controrivoluzione di Asti nel 1797 - Diario sincrono di Stefano Incisa, con documenti inediti	N. Gabiani		1903
19/2	Dieci mesi di carteggio di Ferdinando Dal Pozzo (24 agosto 1831 - 2 giugno 1832)	L. C. Bollea	Testi I	1916

N.	Title	Editors	Series	Year
20	Il «Rigestum Comunis Albe», I	E. Milano, F. Gabotto, F. Eusebio	Cartari XI	1903
21	Il «Rigestum Comunis Albe», II	E. Milano, F. Gabotto, F. Eusebio	Cartari XII	1903
22	Appendice documentaria al «Rigestum Comunis Albe»	F. Gabotto	Cartari XIII	1912
23	Documenti intorno alle relazioni fra Alba e Genova (1141–1270)	A. Ferretto	Cartari XIV	1906
24	Il «Liber Instrumentorum» del Comune di Mondovì	G. Barelli	Cartari XV	1904
25	Il Libro verde della chiesa d'Asti, I	G. Assandria	Cartari XVI	1904
26	Il Libro verde della chiesa d'Asti, II	G. Assandria	Cartari XVII	1907
27	Statuti di Garessio, Ormea, Montiglio e Camino	G. Barelli, E. Durando, E. Gabotto	Cartari XVIII	1907
28	Le più antiche carte dell'archivio capitolare di Asti	F. Gabotto	Cartari XIX	1904
29	Le carte dell'archivio capitolare di Tortona (sec. IX-1220)	F. Gabotto, V. Legè	Cartari XX	1905

N.	Title	Editors	Series	Year
30	Le carte dell'archivio capitolare di Tortona (1221–1313)	F. Gabotto, A. Colombo, V. Legè, C. Patrucco	Cartari XXI	1907
31	Il Chartarium Dertonense ed altri documenti del comune di Tortona (934-1346)	E. Gabotto	Cartari XXII	1909
32	Studi sulla storia del Piemonte avanti il Mille	F. Alessio, F. Gabotto, C. Patrucco	Memorie VIII	1908
33/1	Le torri, le case-forti ed i palazzi nobili medievali in Asti	N. Gabiani	Memorie IX/I	1906
33/1	Gli atti della Società del Popolo di Asti dal 1312 al 1323	N. Gabiani, F. Gabotto	Memorie IX/I	1906
33/1	Gli statuti della Società dei Militi del 1339	N. Gabiani, F. Gabotto	Memorie IX/I	1906
34	Documenti biellesi	P. Sella, F. Guasco di Bisio, F. Gabotto	Cartari XXIII	1908
35	Il "De sanitatis custodia" di maestro Giacomo Albini di Moncalieri, con altri documenti sulla storia della medicina negli stati sabaudi nei secoli XIV e XV	G. Carbonelli	Testi II	1906
36	Le carte dell'archivio arcivescovile di Torino fino al 1310	F. Gabotto, G. B. Barberis	Cartari XXIV	1906
37	Le carte dell'archivio capitolare di Asti (830, 948, 1111–1237)	F. Gabotto, N. Gabiani	Cartari XXV	1907
38	Libro verde del comune di Fossano ed altri documenti fossanesi (984-1314)	G. Salsotto	Cartari XXVI	1909
39	Documenti degli archivi tortonesi relativi alla storia di Voghera, aggiuntevi le carte dell'archivio della cattedrale di Voghera	V. Legè, F. Gabotto	Cartari XXVII	1908

N.	Title	Editors	Series	Year
40	Le carte dell'archivio capitolare di Casale Monferrato fino al 1313, I	F. Gabotto, U. Fisso	Cartari XXVIII	1907
41	Le carte dell'archivio capitolare di Casale Monferrato fino al 1313, II	F. Gabotto, U. Fisso	Cartari XXIX	1908
42	Cartari minori, I (Cartario dei monasteri di Grazzano, Vezzolano, Crea e Pontestura, Cartario del monastero di Rocca delle Donne, Carte varie di Casale e del Monferrato, Le carte dell'archivio comunale di Chivasso)	E. Durando, V. Druetti	Cartari XXX	1908
43	Cartari minori, II (Le carte dell'archivio comunale di Gassino, Cartario di Santa Maria di Belmonte e di San Tommaso di Buzzano, Cartario della chiesa di Santa Maria di Testona, Cartario dell'abazia di Precipiano)	E. Gabotto, G. Frola, V. Ansaldi, L. C. Bollea	Cartari XXXV	1911
44	Cartario dell'abazia di San Solutore di Torino	F. Cognasso	Cartari XXXII	1908
44	Appendice di carte varie relative a chiese e monasteri di Torino	F. Cognasso	Cartari XXXII	1908
45	Le carte della prevostura di Oulx raccolte e riordinate cronologicamente fino al 1300	G. Collino	Cartari XXXIII	1908
46	Documenti degli archivi di Pavia relativi alla storia di Voghera (929-1300)	L. C. Bollea	Cartari XXXIV	1909
47	Documenti vogheresi dell'archivio di Stato di Milano	A. Cavagna Sangiuliani	Cartari XXXV	1910
48	Documenti sulle relazioni fra Voghera e Genova (960-1325)	G. Gorrini	Cartari XXXVI	1908
49	Le carte dell'archivio comunale di Voghera fino al 1300	A. Tallone	Cartari XXXV	1918

N.	Title	Editors	Series	Year
50	Documenti intorno alle relazioni fra Genova e Alba (1270–1321)	A. Ferretto		1910
51	Documenti genovesi di Novi e Valle Scrivia, I (946-1230)	A. Ferretto	Cartari XXIX	1909
52	Documenti genovesi di Novi e Valle Scrivia, II (1231–1260)	A. Ferretto	Cartari XXX	1910
53/1	Il Senato di Pinerolo - Contributo alla Storia della magistratura Subalpina	M. Viora		1927
53/2	Le curie sabaude nel secolo XIII - Saggio di storia del diritto processuale con documenti inediti	M. Chiaudano		1927
54	Dizionario feudale degli antichi stati sardi e della Lombardia, I	F. Guasco		1911
55	Dizionario feudale degli antichi stati sardi e della Lombardia, II	F. Guasco		1911
56	Dizionario feudale degli antichi stati sardi e della Lombardia, III	F. Guasco		1911
57	Dizionario feudale degli antichi stati sardi e della Lombardia, IV	F. Guasco		1911
58	Dizionario feudale degli antichi stati sardi e della Lombardia, V	F. Guasco		1911
59	Cartari dell'abazia di Rivalta Scrivia, I	A. F. Trucco	Cartari XLI	1910

N.	Title	Editors	Series	Year
60/1	Cartari dell'abazia di Rivalta Scrivia, II	A. F. Trucco	Cartari XLII	1911
61	Storia dell'Italia occidentale nel Medio Evo (395-1313) - Libro I: I barbari nell'Italia occidentale, I	F. Gabotto		1911
62	Storia dell'Italia occidentale nel Medio Evo (395-1313) - Libro I: I barbari nell'Italia occidentale, II	F. Gabotto		1911
63	Il memoriale quadripartitum di Fra Gabriele Bucci da Carmagnola	F. Curlo	Testi III	1911
64/1	Statuti di Pontestura	E. Gabotto	Cartari XLIV/I	1910
64/2	Statuti di Rossiglione	A. Pesce	Cartari XLIV/II	1914
64/3	Statuti di Tavagnasco	G. Borghezio, C. Benedetto	Cartari XLIV/III	1929
65	Documenti inediti e sparsi sulla storia di Torino	F. Cognasso	Cartari XLIII	1914
65	Indici	P. Massia		1931
66	Gli ultimi giorni del Conte Rosso e i processi per la sua morte - Studio con documenti inediti	G. Carbonelli	Memorie IX	1912
67	Per la futura storia di Torino	T. Rossi	Cartari XLV	1913
67	Cartario del monastero di Santa Maria di Brione fino all'anno 1300	G. Sella	Cartari XLV	1913
67	Il "Libro delle investiture" di Goffredo di Montanaro vescovo di Torino (1264–1294)	F. Guasco di Bisio	Cartari XLV	1913
68	Cartario della prevostura poi abbazia di Rivalta Piemonte fino al 1300	G. B. Rossano	Cartari XLVI	1912
68	Indice	P. Massia		1935
69	Cartari minori, III (Cartario delle Valli di Stura e di Grana fino al 1317, Carte Piossasco dell'archivio di Bardassano, Carte superstiti del Monastero di San Pietro di Torino, Carte inedite e sparse del Monastero di Tiglieto (1127–1341))	A. Tallone, F. Guasco di Bisio, F. Gabotto, A. Pesce	Cartari XLVII	1912-1923

N.	Title	Editors	Series	Year
70	Le carte dell'archivio capitolare di Vercelli, I	D. Arnoldi, G. C. Faccio, F. Gabotto, G. Rocchi	Cartari XLVII	1912
71	Le carte dell'archivio capitolare di Vercelli, II	D. Arnoldi, F. Gabotto	Cartari XLVIII	1914
72	Documenti sulle relazioni commerciali fra Asti e Genova (1182–1310)	G. Rosso	Cartari XLIX	1913
73/1	Le carte dell'archivio capitolare di Savona	V. Pongiglione	Cartari L/I	1913
73/2	Libro delle investiture del vescovo di Vercelli Giovanni Fieschi (1349–1350)	D. Arnoldi		1934
74	Il libro rosso del comune di Ivrea	G. Assandria	Cartari LI	1914
75	Il libro rosso del comune di Chieri	F. Gabotto, F. Guasco di Bisio	Cartari LII	1918
76	Appendice al libro rosso del comune di Chieri	F. Gabotto	Cartari LIII	1913-1924
76	Statuti civili del comune di Chieri (1313)	F. Cognasso	Cartari LIII	1913-1924
77/1	Le più antiche carte dell'archivio di San Gaudenzio di Novara (sec. IX-XI)	C. Salsotto		1937
77/2	Le carte del Museo Civico di Novara (881-1346)	G. B. Morandi		1913
77/3	Le carte del capitolo di Gozzano (1002–1300)	M. Bori	Cartari LIV	1913
78	Le carte dell'archivio capitolare di Santa Maria di Novara, I (729-1034)	F. Gabotto, A. Lizier, A. Leone, G. B. Morandi, O. Scarzello	Cartari LV	1913
79	Le carte dell'archivio capitolare di Santa Maria di Novara, II (1034–1172)	F. Gabotto, G. Basso, A. Leone, G. B. Morandi, O. Scarzello	Cartari LVI	1913

N.	Title	Editors	Series	Year
80	Le carte dell'archivio capitolare di Santa Maria di Novara, III (1172–1205)	A. Leone, G. B. Morandi, O. Scarzello		1924
81/1	I necrologî del Capitolo d'Ivrea	G. Borghezio		1925
81/2	Cartario della Confraria del Santo Spirito d'Ivrea (1208–1276)	G. Borghezio, G. Pinoli		1929
82	Storia di Torino, I (fino al 1280)	T. Rossi, F. Gabotto		1914
83	La rivoluzione piemontese del 1821, I	T. Rossi, C. Pio Demagistris		1927
84	La rivoluzione piemontese del 1821, II	T. Rossi, C. Pio Demagistris		1927
85	Cartario del monastero di Muleggio	P. Sella	Cartari LIX	1917
85	Le carte dell'archivio arcivescovile di Vercelli	D. Arnoldi	Cartari LIX	1917
86	Carte varie a supplemento e complemento dei volumi II, III, XI, XII, XIII, XIV, XV, XXII, XXXVI, XLIV, LXV, LXVII, LXVIII della Biblioteca della Società Storica Subalpina	F. Gabotto, F. Guasco di Bisio, G. Peyrani, G. B. Rossano, M. Vanzetti	Cartari LX	1916
87	Tomaso I Marchese di Saluzzo (1244–1296) - Monografia storica con appendice di documenti inediti	A. Tallone	Memorie X	1916
88	Sulle relazioni tra la Repubblica di Genova e Filippo Maria Visconti dal 1435 al 1447, I (1435–1438)	A. Pesce		1921
89	Le carte del monastero di Rocca delle Donne	F. Loddo		1929

N.	Title	Editors	Series	Year
90	Memorie politiche civili e militari della città di Alessandria dall'anno della sua fondazione MCLXVIII al MCCXIII	G. O. Bissati		1926
90	Vecchi cronisti alessandrini	L. Madaro		1926
91/1	Le carte del Monastero di San Venerio del Tino, I (1050–1200)	G. Falco	Cartari LXIII/I	1920
91/2	Le carte del Monastero di San Venerio del Tino, II (1200–1300)	G. Falco	Cartari LXIII/II	1933
92	Corpus Statutorum Canavisii, I	G. Frola	Cartari LXIV	1918
93	Corpus Statutorum Canavisii, II	G. Frola	Cartari LXV	1918
94	Corpus Statutorum Canavisii, III	G. Frola	Cartari LXVI	1918

=== New series ===
In 1921, a new series of the collection began under the direction of Armando Tallone, coinciding with the reestablishment of the Società Storica Subalpina after the death of Ferdinando Gabotto.

N.	Title	Editors	Year
95	Il Registrum Magnum del comune di Piacenza, I	A. Corna, F. Ercole, A. Tallone	1921
96/1	Per la storia di Tortona nell'età del Comune, I	F. Gabotto	1922
96/2	Per la storia di Tortona nell'età del Comune, II documenti	F. Gabotto	1925
96/3	San Marziano primo vescovo di Tortona e martire	V. Legè	1922
97	Il libro dei «pacta et conventiones» del comune di Vercelli	G. C. Faccio	1926
98	Storia di Bricherasio	L. C. Bollea	1928
99	Cartario di Bricherasio (1159–1859) con appendice di statuti e bandi campestri	L. C. Bollea	1928

N.	Title	Editors	Year
100	I Marchesi del Monferrato in Italia e in Oriente durante i secoli XII e XIII, I	L. Usseglio	1926
101	I Marchesi del Monferrato in Italia e in Oriente durante i secoli XII e XIII, II	L. Usseglio	1926
102	Asti nei principali suoi ricordi storici, I	G. Gabiani	1927
103	Le carte dell'archivio comunale di Biella fino al 1379, I	L. Borello, A. Tallone	1927
104	Le carte dell'archivio comunale di Biella fino al 1379, II	L. Borello, A. Tallone	1928
105	Le carte dell'archivio comunale di Biella fino al 1379, III	L. Borello, A. Tallone	1930
106	Le carte dell'archivio del Duomo di Torino (904-1300 con appendice di carte scelte 1301–1433)	G. Borghezio, C. Fasola	1931
107	Lo Stato sabaudo al tempo di Emanuele Filiberto, I	C. Patrucco	1928
108	Lo Stato sabaudo al tempo di Emanuele Filiberto, II	C. Patrucco	1928
109	Lo Stato sabaudo al tempo di Emanuele Filiberto, III	C. Patrucco	1928

N.	Title	Editors	Year
110	S. Dalmazzo di Pedona e la sua abazia con documenti inediti	A. M. Riberi	1929
111	Miscellanea Cuneese	S. Pivano	1930
112	I Diari delle Campagne di Fiandra	Emanuele Filiberto Duca di Savoia, E. Brunelli, P. Egidi	1928
113	Cartario alessandrino fino al 1300, I	F. Gasparolo	1928
114	Il Piemonte nell'antichità classica - Saggio di corografia storica	D. Gribaudi	1928
115	Cartario alessandrino fino al 1300, II	F. Gasparolo	1930
116	La dominazione angioina in Piemonte	G. B. Monti	1930
117	Cartario alessandrino fino al 1300, III	F. Gasparolo	1930
118	Saggi di politica economica carlo albertina	A. Fossati	1930
119	La valle del Tanaro - Saggio antropogeografico	G. Rosso	1930

N.	Title	Editors	Year
120	Carlo Emanuele I - Miscellanea, I		1930
121	Carlo Emanuele I - Miscellanea, II		1930
122	Girolamo Vincenzo Spanzotti - Contributo alla storia del Giansenismo piemontese	M. Gori	1931
123	Miscellanea valsesiana		1931
124	Carte valsesiane fino al secolo XV conservate negli archivi pubblici	C. G. Mor	1933
125	Statuti di Savigliano	I. M. Sacco	1933
126	I privilegi di Stamento Militare nelle famiglie Sarde (da documenti inediti del Viceré Marchese San Martino di Rivarolo)	V. Prunas-Tola	1933
126	Notizie di storia e cronaca isolana sul patriziato di Sardegna	E. Amat di San Filippo	1933
127	Cartario dell'abazia di Breme	L. C. Bollea	1933
128	Cartario di Vigevano e del suo comitato	A. Colombo	1933
129	Carte e statuti dell'Agro Ticinese (Carte del monastero di San Maiolo nell'Almo Collegio Borromeo di Pavia (932-1266), Statuta, decreta et ordinamenta Societatis et Collegii notariorum Papie reformata (1255–1274), Statuta loci Vartii del 1320, Gli antichi statuti di Vigevano (Liber statutorum veterum terre Viglevani))	R. Maiocchi, R. Soriga, A. Colombo	1933

N.	Title	Editors	Year
130	Miscellanea pavese		1932
131	La Finanza Sabauda nel sec. XIII, I - I rendiconti del Dominio dal 1257 al 1285	M. Chiaudano	1933
132	La Finanza Sabauda nel sec. XIII, II - I "Rotuli" e i "Computi" della Corte di Filippo I conte di Savoia e di Borgogna dal 1269 al 1285	M. Chiaudano	1934
133	La Finanza Sabauda nel sec. XIII, III - Le "Extente" e altri documenti del Dominio (1205–1306)	M. Chiaudano	1938
134			
135			
136	Le carte dell'archivio comunale di Biella fino al 1379, IV	L. Borello	1933
137/1	Statuti di Revigliasco Torinese	E. Bianco di San Secondo	1933
137/2	Statuti di Canelli	A. Tallone	1935
138	Gli statuti del Comune di Torino del 1360	D. Bizzarri	1933
138	Gli statuti della Società di S. Giovanni Battista di Torino del 1389	M. Chiaudano	1933
139	Il Piemonte dalla capanna neolitica ai monumenti di Augusto, I	P. Baroncelli	1933

N.	Title	Editors	Year
140	Studi su Vittorio Amedeo II		1933
141	Le Carte dell'archivio capitolare di Asti (1238–1272)	L. Vergano	1942
142	Documenti sulle relazioni tra la Casa di Savoia e la Santa Sede nel Medio Evo (1066–1268)	P. Fontana	1939
143	La polemica sul medioevo	G. Falco	1933
144	La Rivoluzione Italiana - Da Vittorio Alfieri A Benito Mussolini	C. A. Avenati	1934
145	I Biscioni, I/1	G. C. Faccio, M. Ranno	1934
146	I Biscioni, I/2	G. C. Faccio, M. Ranno	1939
147/1	Il «liber instromentorum» del comune di Ceva	G. Barelli	1936
147/2	Statuti e Carte di franchigia di Monbasilio	G. Barelli	1936
148	L'umanesimo subalpino nel secolo XV	G. Vinay	1935
149	Bibliografia piemontese-ligure (serie seconda, nn. 5001-10248)	G. Borghezio	1935

N.	Title	Editors	Year
150	Bibliografia piemontese-ligure (serie seconda, nn. 10249-13111)	G. Borghezio	1940
151	Le carte di Giovanni Lanza, I (1829–1857)	C. M. De Vecchi di Val Cismon	1935
152	Le carte di Giovanni Lanza, II (1858–1863)	C. M. De Vecchi di Val Cismon	1936
153	Le carte di Giovanni Lanza, III (1865)	C. M. De Vecchi di Val Cismon	1936
154	Le carte di Giovanni Lanza, IV (1866–1869)	C. M. De Vecchi di Val Cismon	1937
155	Le carte di Giovanni Lanza, V (1870 - gennaio-agosto)	C. M. De Vecchi di Val Cismon	1937
156	Le carte di Giovanni Lanza, VI (1870 - settembre-dicembre)	C. M. De Vecchi di Val Cismon	1938
157	L'arte a Casale Monferrato dal XI al XVIII secolo	N. Gabrielli	1935
158	Il pensiero economico del Conte G. F. Galeni-Napione (1748–1830)	A. Fossati	1936
159/1	Statuta et capitula Societatis sancti Georgii seu populi chariensis, I/I	G. Borghezio, B. Valimperti	1936
159/2	Statuta et capitula Societatis sancti Georgii seu populi chariensis, I/II	M. Chiaudano, B. Valimperti	1940

N.	Title	Editors	Year
160	L'equilibrio italiano nella politica europea alla vigilia della guerra per la successione polacca (da documenti inediti)	G. Quazza	1944
161	I più antichi catasti del comune di Chieri (1253)	M. C. Daviso di Charvensod	1939
162	Gli ordinati del comune di Chieri (1328–1329)	P. Brezzi	1937
163	Fonti e studi di storia fossanese	L. Berra, G. Falco, A. M. Riberi, F. Sacco, I. M. Sacco, L. Vigliani	1936
164	Il principe sabaudo Emanuele Filiberto grande ammiraglio di Spagna e viceré di Sicilia - Con documenti inediti	L. La Rocca	1940
165	Consignationes beneficiorum diocesis Novariensis factae anno MCCCXLVII, tempore reverendissimi domini Guglielmi episcopi, I	L. Cassani, G. Mellerio, M. Tosi	1937
166	Consignationes beneficiorum diocesis Novariensis factae anno MCCCXLVII, tempore reverendissimi domini Guglielmi episcopi, II	L. Cassani, G. Mellerio, M. Tosi	1937
167	Consignationes beneficiorum diocesis Novariensis factae anno MCCCXLVII, tempore reverendissimi domini Guglielmi episcopi, III - Index	G. Mellerio, M. Tosi	1939
168	L'eredità di Giangaleazzo Visconti	N. Valeri	1938
169	Documenti sulla politica fiscale e sui rapporti finanziari tra gli eserciti alleati durante l'occupazione franco-sabauda del Milanese dal 1733 al 1736	C. Salsotto	1942

N.	Title	Editors	Year
170	Le carte del monastero di San Venerio del Tino relative alla Corsica (1080–1500)	G. Pistarino	1944
171	Le carte di Giovanni Lanza, VII (1871)	C. M. De Vecchi di Val Cismon	1939
172	Le carte di Giovanni Lanza, VIII (1872-1873 luglio)	C. M. De Vecchi di Val Cismon	1939
173	Le carte di Giovanni Lanza, IX (luglio 1873–1877)	C. M. De Vecchi di Val Cismon	1940
174	Le carte di Giovanni Lanza, X (1878-1882 marzo)	C. M. De Vecchi di Val Cismon	1941
175	Le carte di Giovanni Lanza, XI (appendice e indici)	C. M. De Vecchi di Val Cismon	1943
176	Statuti e documenti di Carrù	G. Barelli	1952
176	Statuti e "Liber franchisiarum et libertatum" di Dogliani	G. Barelli	1952
177	Il cartulario di Giovanni di Giona di Portovenere (sec. XIII)	G. Falco, G. Pistarino	1955
178	I Biscioni, I/3	R. Ordano	1956
179	Cartario della Certosa di Casotto (1172–1326)	G. Barelli	1957

N.	Title	Editors	Year
180/1	Le pergamene di San Giulio d'Orta dell'Archivio di Stato di Torino	G. Fornaseri	1958
180/2	Le pergamene di San Giulio d'Orta della Biblioteca comunale di Novara	M. G. Virgili	1962
181	I Biscioni	R. Ordano	1970
182	Gli Statuti di Bra	E. Mosca	1958
183/1	Gli Statuti di Incisa	G. Albenga	1960
183/2	Gli statuti di Pamparato	G. Barelli	1965
184/1	Gli Statuti del consortile di Cocconato	M. C. Daviso Di Charvensod, M. A. Benedetto	1965
184/2	Statuti di Lesegno	G. Barelli	1966
184/3	Gli statuti di Rifreddo e Gambasca	A. Tamagnone	1969
185	Gli Statuti d'Ivrea, I	G. S. Pene Vidari	1968
186	Gli Statuti d'Ivrea, II	G. S. Pene Vidari	1969
187	I protocolli di Tedisio vescovo di Torino	D. B. Fissore	1969
188	Gli Statuti di Ivrea, III	G. S. Pene Vidari	1974
189	I Biscioni del comune di Vercelli, II/2	R. Ordano	1976

N.	Title	Editors	Year
190	Le carte dell'Archivio Capitolare di Asti (secc. XII - XIII)	A. M. Cotto, G. G. Fissore, P. Gosetti, E. Rossanino	1986
191	Per una storia economica del Piemonte medievale - Strade e mercati dell'area sud-occidentale	R. Comba	1984
192	Da Testona a Moncalieri - Vicende del popolamento sulla collina torinese nel Medioevo	C. La Rocca	1986
193	L'abbazia di S. Genuario di Lucedio e le sue pergamene	P. Cancian	1975
194	Indice onomastico e toponomastico delle carte dell'Archivio capitolare di S. Maria di Novara (729-1205)	M. Bosco	1981
195	Cartario della Certosa di Losa e Monte Benedetto dal 1189 al 1252	M. Bosco	1974
196	La diocesi di Torino nel Medioevo	G. Casiraghi	1979
197/1	Gli Statuti di Genola	R. Comba	1970
197/2	Gli Statuti di Villafalletto	R. Comba	1970
198	Santa Maria di Vezzolano - Una fondazione signorile nell'età della riforma ecclesiastica	A. A. Settia	1975
199	La popolazione del Piemonte sul finire del Medioevo - Ricerche di demografia storica	R. Comba	1977

N.	Title	Editors	Year
200	Città e territorio nell'alto medioevo - La società astigiana dal dominio dei Franchi all'affermazione comunale	R. Bordone	1980
201	Il mito angioino nella cultura italiana e provenzale fra Duecento e Trecento	A. Barbero	1983
202	La società cittadina del Regno d'Italia - Formazione e sviluppo delle caratteristiche urbane nei secoli XI e XII	R. Bordone	1987
203	La riforma legislativa di Carlo II di Savoia - Un tentativo di consolidazione agli albori dello Stato moderno - 1533	G. P. Patriarca	1988
204	La cancelleria di un antipapa - Felice V - Amedeo VIII	E. Mongiano	1988
205	Regesto dei marchesi di Monferrato di stirpe aleramica e paleologa per l'«Outremer» e l'Oriente (secoli XII-XV)	W. Haberstumpf	1989
206	I Signori di Morozzo nei secoli X-XIV: un percorso politico del Piemonte meridionale	P. Guglielmotti	1990
207	L'aristocrazia del Vaud fino alla conquista sabauda (inizio XI - metà XIII secolo)	G. Castelnuovo	1990
208	Villaggi nuovi del Piemonte medievale: Villastellone e Pecetto	M. Montanari	1991
209	Dai marchesi del Vasto ai primi marchesi di Saluzzo - Sviluppi signorili entro quadri pubblici (secoli XI-XII)	L. Provero	1992

N.	Title	Editors	Year
210	Vicende, dipendenze e documenti dell'Abbazia di S. Michele della Chiusa	P. Cancian, G. Casiraghi	1993
211	I Biscioni del comune di Vercelli (t. II, vol. III)	R. Ordano	1994
212	Gli Aleramici	R. Merlone	1995
213/1	Dal convento alla città - La vita torinese attraverso il registro dell'archivio del Convento di S. Domenico redatto dal padre G. A. Torre (1780), I	V. Ferrua	1995
213/2	Dal convento alla città - La vita torinese attraverso il registro dell'archivio del Convento di S. Domenico redatto dal padre G. A. Torre (1780), II	V. Ferrua	1995
214	Le carte dell'Abbazia di San Bartolomeo di Azzano d'Asti	A. M. Cotto, G. G. Fissore, S. Nebbia	1999
215	Iuxta Fines Alpium - Uomini e dei nel Piemonte Romano	S. Giorcelli Bersani, S. Roda	1999
216	I Biscioni - Nuovi documenti e regesti cronologici	R. Ordano	2000
217	Documenti sull'attività della cancelleria sabauda a metà del secolo XIV	A. Barbaglia, A. Calzolari, R. Cosentino	2001
218	Giuseppe Villa d'Andezeno e Paolo Benedicenti - I Domenicani nella «Lombardia superiore» dalle origini al 1891	V. Ferrua	2002
219	Cartulari notarili dell'Archivio Capitolare di Asti - I registri di Iacobus Sarrachus notaio del vicario vescovile (1309–1316)	A. M. Cotto Melluccio, G. G. Fissore, L. Franco	2002

N.	Title	Editors	Year
220	Il codice della «Fidelitates Astenses» dell'Archivio di Stato di Torino (1387–1389)	D. Gnetti	2007
221	I protocolli notarili dell'Archivio Capitolare di Asti - Regesti	G. G. Fissore, B. Maina, G. Scarcia	2009
222	Il Monastero cistercense femminile di S. Michele d'Ivrea - Relazioni sociali, spazi di autonomia e limiti di azione nella documentazione inedita dei secoli XIII-XV	C. Sereno	2009
223	Cumiana medievale	A. Barbero	2011
224	La spada e la grazia - Vite di aristocratici nel Trecento subalpino	B. Del Bo	2011
225	Ritorni a Santa Maria di Vezzolano	A. A. Settia	2013
226	Strutture e protagonisti del medioevo ecclesiastico piemontese	G. Casiraghi	2016
227	La documentazione dei principi di Savoia-Acaia - Prassi e fisionomia di una burocrazia notarile in costruzione	P. Buffo	2017
228/1	La loi du Prince - La raccolta normativa sabauda di Amedeo VIII, I - Gli Statuti sabaudi di Amedeo VIII del 1430 - Un'opera legislativa di rilievo	M. Caesar, F. Morenzoni	2019
228/2	La loi du Prince - La raccolta normativa sabauda di Amedeo VIII, II - Compendium statutorum generalis reformacionis Sabaudie	C. Amman-Doubliez	2019

== See also ==
- Historiae Patriae Monumenta

== Bibliography ==
- Luigi Cesare Bollea (1911). "La Biblioteca della Società Storica Subalpina, diretta da Ferdinando Gabotto, nei suoi primi undici anni di vita" [The Library of the Subalpine Historical Society, directed by Ferdinando Gabotto, in its first eleven years of life]. Rivista Storica Italiana (in Italian). XXVIII (III, fasc. 2). Turin: 137–167.
- Flavia Negro (2016). "Storia di un'edizione: il liber iurium dei Biscioni dalla Società Storica Subalpina alla Deputazione Subalpina di Storia Patria" [History of an edition: the liber iurium of the Biscioni from the Subalpine Historical Society to the Subalpine Deputation for Homeland History]. In Rinaldo Comba (ed.). Rosaldo Ordano - L'uomo, l'organizzatore di cultura, lo storico [Rosaldo Ordano - The man, the cultural organizer, the historian] (PDF) (in Italian). Vercelli: Società Storica Vercellese. pp. 97–150 – via IRIS-AperTO - Università di Torino.
