= Edition notice =

Page in a book containing information

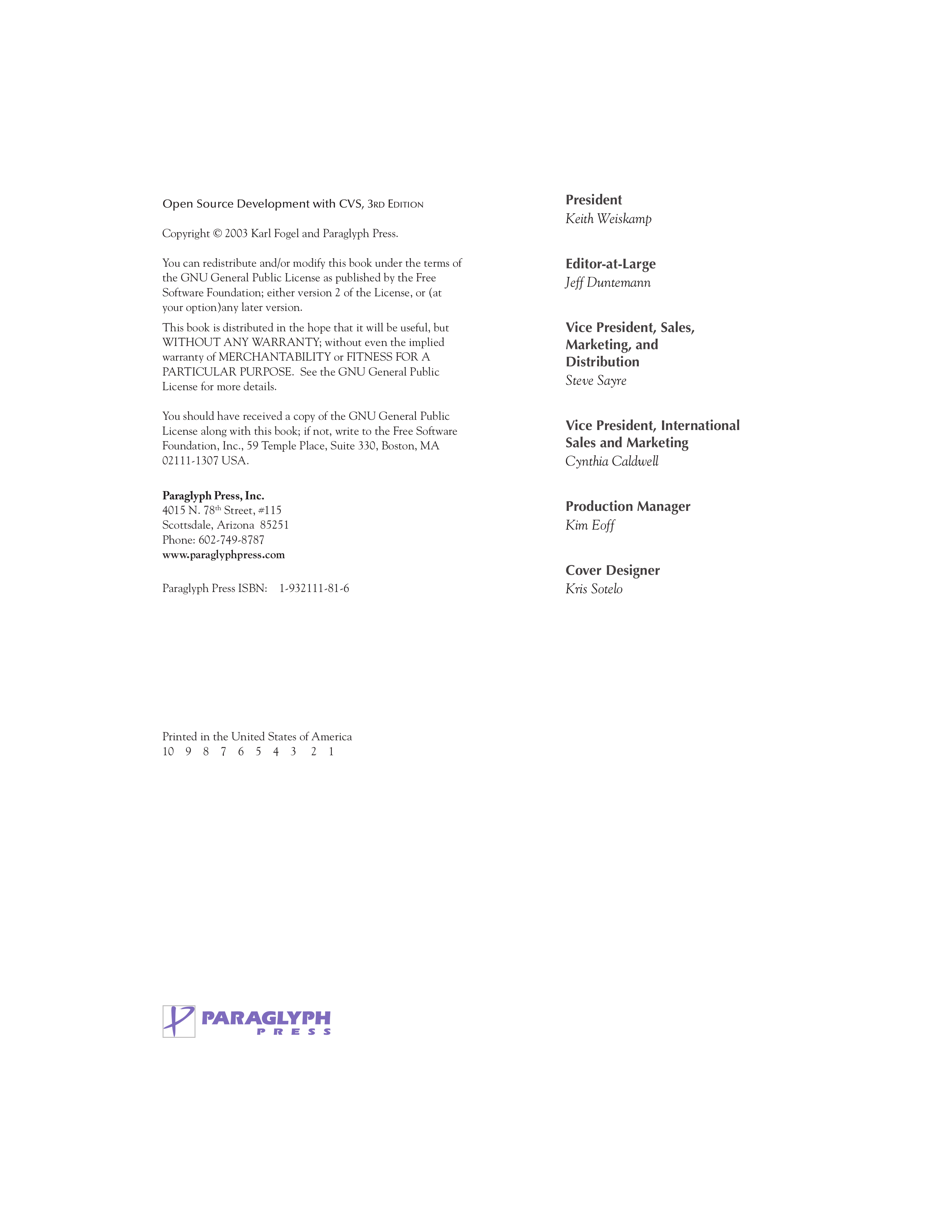
Edition notice page of "Open Source Development with CVS" 3rd Edition, by Karl Fogel and Moshe Bar, published by Paraglyph Press, 2004.

The edition notice (or copyright page) is the page in a book containing information about the current edition, usually on the back of the title page. It often contains a copyright notice, legal notices, publication information, printing history, cataloguing information from a national library, and an ISBN that uniquely identifies the work.

At the bottom of the edition notice one often finds a line of numbers, some of which may appear to be missing, called the printer's key. These indicate the book's print run.

Sometimes, there will also be a warning indicating that the book sold without a cover is a stripped book.

== See also ==
- Colophon (publishing)
- Impressum
