= Vintage Books =

American publishing imprint

- Parent company: Knopf Doubleday Publishing Group (Penguin Random House)
- Status: Active
- Founded: 1954; 72 years ago
- Founder: Alfred A. Knopf Sr.
- Country of origin: United States; United Kingdom
- Headquarters location: New York City
- Imprints: Vintage Classics; Black Lizard; Bodley Head; Jonathan Cape; Chatto and Windus; Harvill Secker; Hogarth Press; Square Peg; Yellow Jersey
- Owner: Bertelsmann
- Official website: knopfdoubleday.com/imprint/vintage

Vintage Books is a trade paperback publishing imprint of Penguin Random House originally established by Alfred A. Knopf in 1954. The company was acquired by Random House in April 1960, and a British division was set up in 1990. After Random House merged with Bantam Doubleday Dell, Doubleday's Anchor Books trade paperback line was added to the same division as Vintage. After Random House merged with Penguin, Vintage UK was transferred to Penguin UK.

In addition to publishing classic and contemporary works in paperback under the Vintage brand, the imprint also oversees the sub-imprints Bodley Head, Jonathan Cape, Chatto and Windus, Harvill Secker, Hogarth Press, Square Peg, and Yellow Jersey. Vintage began publishing some titles in the mass-market paperback format in 2003.

== Edition identification ==
For first editions, Vintage Books has "First Edition" printed on the edition notice, above the copyright notice, with a "1". The number is present in any edition.
