= Historiae Patriae Monumenta =

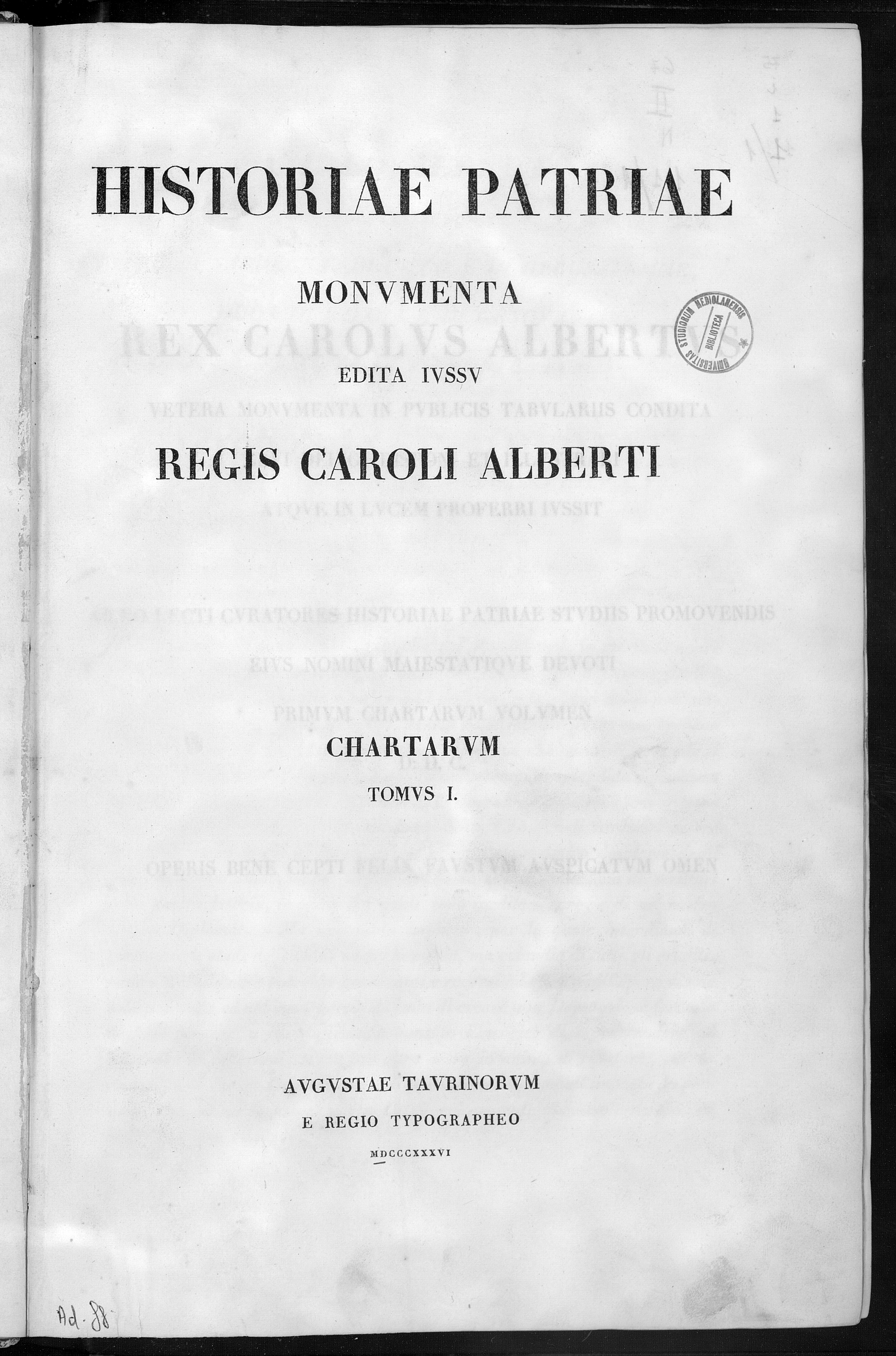
- Title page of the first volume.
- Author: Regia Deputazione sopra gli studi di Storia Patria
- Language: Latin (Italian & French)
- Publisher: Augustae Tavrinorum e Regio Typographeo
- Publication date: 1836
- Publication place: Kingdom of Sardinia
- Followed by: Vols 2 - 22

The twenty-two volumes of the Historiæ Patriæ Monumenta series (often identified with the abbreviation HPM) contain Italian historical documents and were published between 1836 and 1901 in two series.

The volumes, which were initially devoted solely to the history of the Kingdom of Sardinia, were produced by the Royal Mission for the Study of the History of the Fatherland [Italian: Regia Deputazione sopra gli studi di Storia Patria], founded in 1833 in Turin by King Charles Albert of Sardinia.

An alternative title, Monumenta Historiæ Patriæ was used on the title page and in the half-title of volumes II to V and only in the half-title from volume X onwards.

The 20th volume (Leges Municipales, IV) was not published until 1955.

== Volumes ==
=== First Series ===
- Volume. Chartarum, I, Turin, 1836.
  - Chartae ab anno DCII ad annum MCCLXXXXII
- Volume II. Leges Municipales, I, Turin, 1838.
  - Statuta ac privilegia civitatis Secusiae (Susa)
  - Statuta et privilegia civitatis Augustae Praetoriae (Aosta)
  - Statuta et privilegia civitatis Niciae (Nice)
  - Statuta consulatus ianuensis (Genoa)
  - Statuta et privilegia civitatis Taurinensis (Turin)
  - Statuta Societatis beati Georgii populi Chieriensis (Chieri)
  - Statuta communis Casalis (Casale Monferrato)
  - Statuta civitatis Eporediae (Ivrea)
  - Statuta civitatis Montiscalerii (Moncalieri)
- Volume III. Scriptorum, I, Turin, 1840.
  - Anciennes chroniques de Savoye
  - Perrinet Dupin, Chronique du conte Rouge
  - Chronica latina Sabaudiae
  - Chronica abbatiae Altaecumbae
  - Chronica ab anno 1475 usque ad annum 1515
  - Domenicus Machaneus, Epitomae historicae
  - Pierre Lambert de la Croix, Memoires sur la vie de Charles duc de Savoye neuvième
  - Giuseppe Cambiano, Historico discorso al serenissimo Filippo Emanuele di Savoia
- Volume IV. Scriptorum, II, Turin, 1839.
  - Pietro Gioffredo, Storia delle Alpi Marittime, libri XXVI.
- Volume V. Scriptorum, III, Turin, 1848.
  - Fragmenta chronicae antiquae civitatis Pedonae
  - Vita beati Dalmatii
  - Chronicon novaliciense
  - Waltharius
  - Beati Heldradi novaliciensis abbatis vita
  - Necrologium prioratus sancti Andreae taurinensis
  - Necrologium monasterii sanctorum Solutoris, Adventoris et Octavii taurinensis
  - Sancti Iohannis confessoris archiepiscopi ravennatis ecclesiae vita
  - Libellus narrationis seu chronicon coenobii sancti Michaelis de Clusa
  - Willelmus, Venerabilis Benedicti clusensis abbatis vita
  - Summariae constitutiones monasterii beatae Mariae de Abundantia
  - Necrologium monasterii beatae Mariae de Abundantia
  - Fragmentum martyrologii ecclesiae beati Evasii casalensis
  - Necrologium insignis collegii canonicorum sanctorum Petri et Ursi Augustae Praetoriae
  - Selecta e libro anniverssariorum, refectoriorum, vigiliarum et missarum conventualium ecclesiae cathedralis augustanae
  - Martyrologium graeco-augustanum ecclesiae sancti Mauricii de Brusson
  - Kalendarium augustanum
  - Extractus anniversariorum, refectoriorum, vigiliarum et missarum conventualium fieri solitarum in ecclesiae cathedrali civitatis Augustae Praetoriae
  - Ogerio Alfieri, Fragmenta de gestium astesium
  - Memoriale Guilielmi Venturae civis astensis
  - Memoriale Secundini Venturae civis astensis
  - Gioffredo della Chiesa, Cronaca di Saluzzo
  - Galeotto del Carretto, Cronica di Monferrato
  - Benvenuti Sangeorgii chronicon
  - Iacopo da Acqui, Chronicon imaginis mundi
- Volume VI. Chartarum, II, Turin, 1853.
  - Chartae ab anno DCC ad annum MCCLXXXXIX
  - Ursonis notarii ianuensis Carmen, saec. XIII.
- Volume VII. Liber Iurium Reipublicae Genuensis, I, Turin, 1854.
- Volume VIII. Edicta Regum Langobardorum, I, Turin, 1855.
- Volume IX. Liber Iurium Reipublicae Genuensis, II, Turin, 1857.
- Volume X. Codex diplomaticus Sardiniae, I, Turin, 1861.
- Volume XI. Scriptores, IV, Turin, 1863.
  - Guglielmino Schiavina, Annales alexandrini
  - Anastasio Germonio, Commentariorum libri
  - Giuseppe Francesco Meyranesio, Pedemontium sacrum
- Volume XII. Codex diplomaticus Sardiniae, II, Turin, 1868.
- Volume XIII. Chartarum, III, Torino, 1873.
  - Codex diplomaticus Langobardie
- Volume XIV. Comitiorum, I, Pars prior, Turin, 1879.
  - Statutes and documents from the representative assembly of the Kingdom of Savoy, I, 1264-1560, edited by Frederigo Emanuele Bollati.
- Volume XV. Comitiorum, I, Pars altera, Turin, 1884.
  - Atti e documenti delle antiche assemblee rappresentative nella Monarchia di Savoia, II, anni 1561-1766, edited by F. E. Bollati di Saint Pierre.
- Volume XVI Part I. Leges Municipales, II, pars prior, Turin, 1876.
  - Liber statutorum consulum cumanorum iusticie et negociatorum (Como), edited by Antonio Ceruti
  - Liber statutorum comunis Novocomi (Como), edited by Antonio Ceruti
  - Statuta communitatis Novariae (Novara), a cura di Antonio Ceruti
  - Liber consuetudinum Mediolani anno MCCXVI collectarum (Milan), edited by Giulio Porro Lambertenghi
  - Statuta iurisdictionum Mediolani (Milan), edited by Antonio Ceruti
- Volume XVI Part II. Leges Municipales, II, pars altera, Turin, 1876.
  - Statuta communis Vercellarum (Vercelli), edited by Giovanni Battista Adriani
  - Statuti bresciani del secolo XIII (Brescia), edited by Federico Odorici
  - Antiquae collationes statuti veteris civitatis Pergami (Bergamo)
- Volume XVII. Codex diplomaticus ecclesiensis (in Latin). Turin: Fratelli Bocca. 1877. (Villa di Chiesa).
- Volume XVIII. Leges Municipales, Turin, 1901.
  - Leges genuenses (Genoa)
- Volume XIX. Liber potheris communis civitatis Brixie (Brescia), edited by Federico Odorici, Turin, 1899.
- Volume XX. Leges Municipales, IV, Turin, 1955.
  - Statues of Pinerolo and the Statutes of Chieri.

=== Second Series ===
- Volume XXI. Codex diplomaticus Cremonae, I, Torino, 1895.
  - Lorenzo Astegiano, Codice diplomatico cremonese, 715-1334, I.
- Volume XXII. Codex diplomaticus Cremonae, II, Torino, 1898.
  - Lorenzo Astegiano, Codice diplomatico cremonese, 715-1334, II.
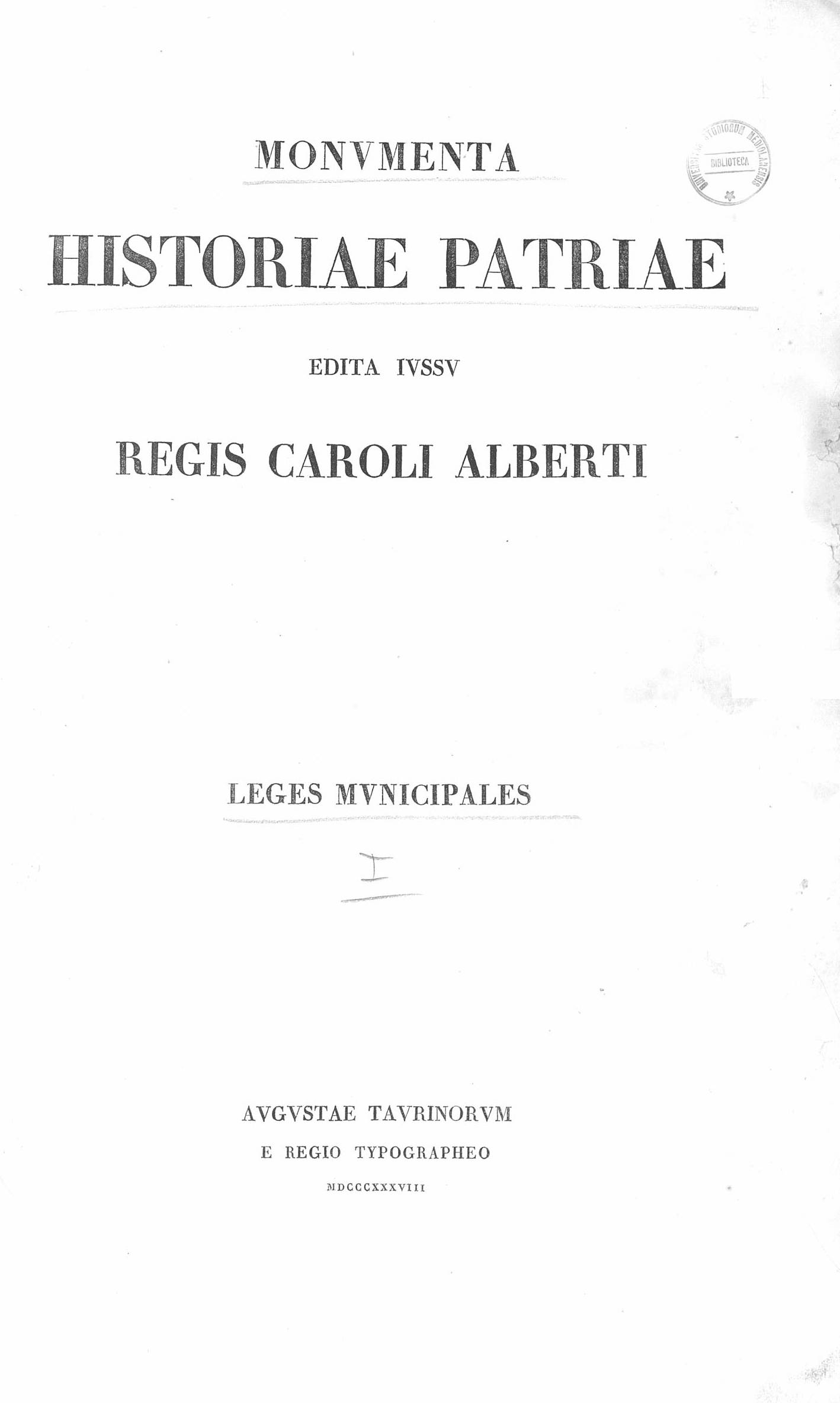
Vol II: Leges municipales (1838)

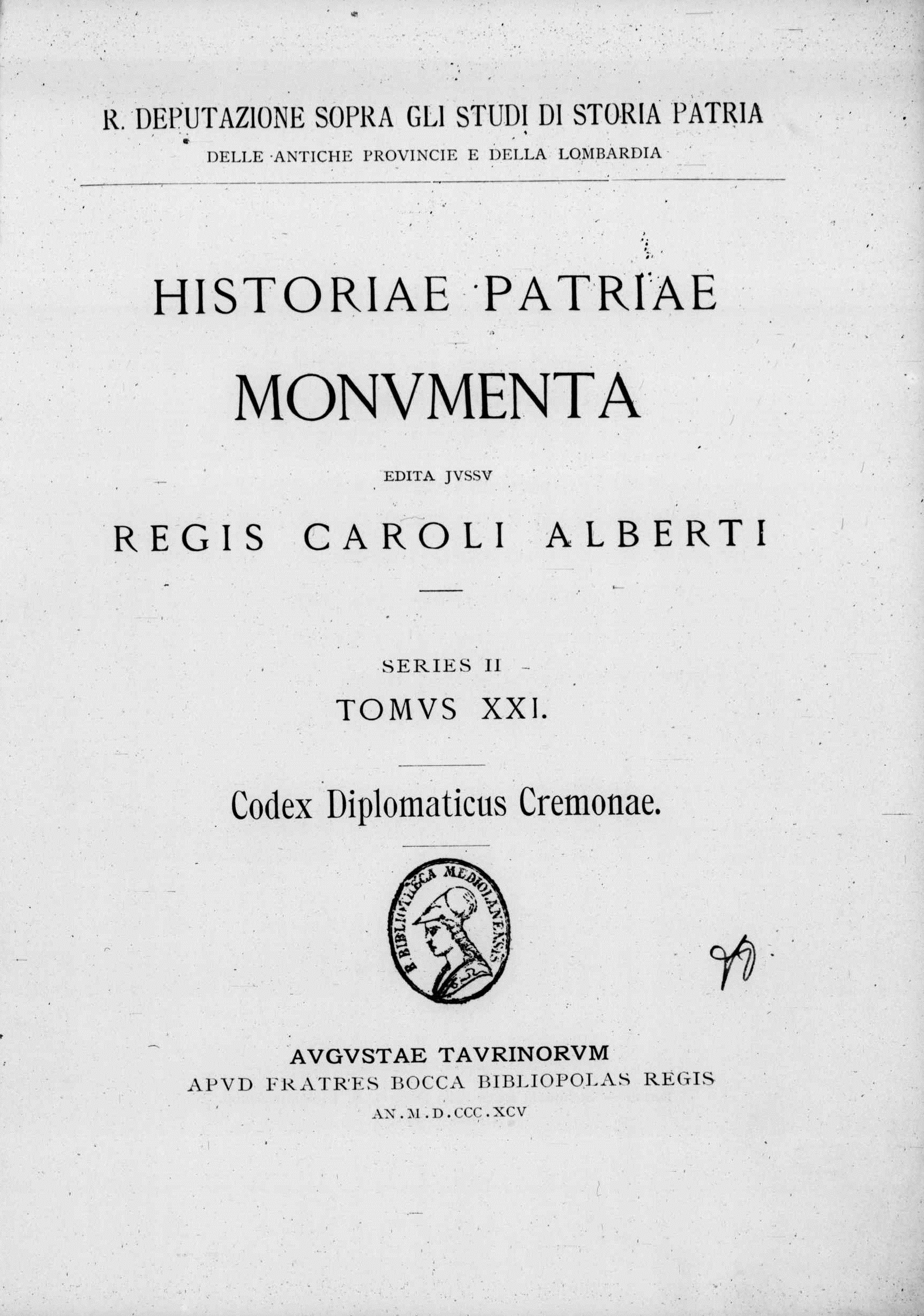
Vol XXI: Codex diplomaticus Cremonae (1895)

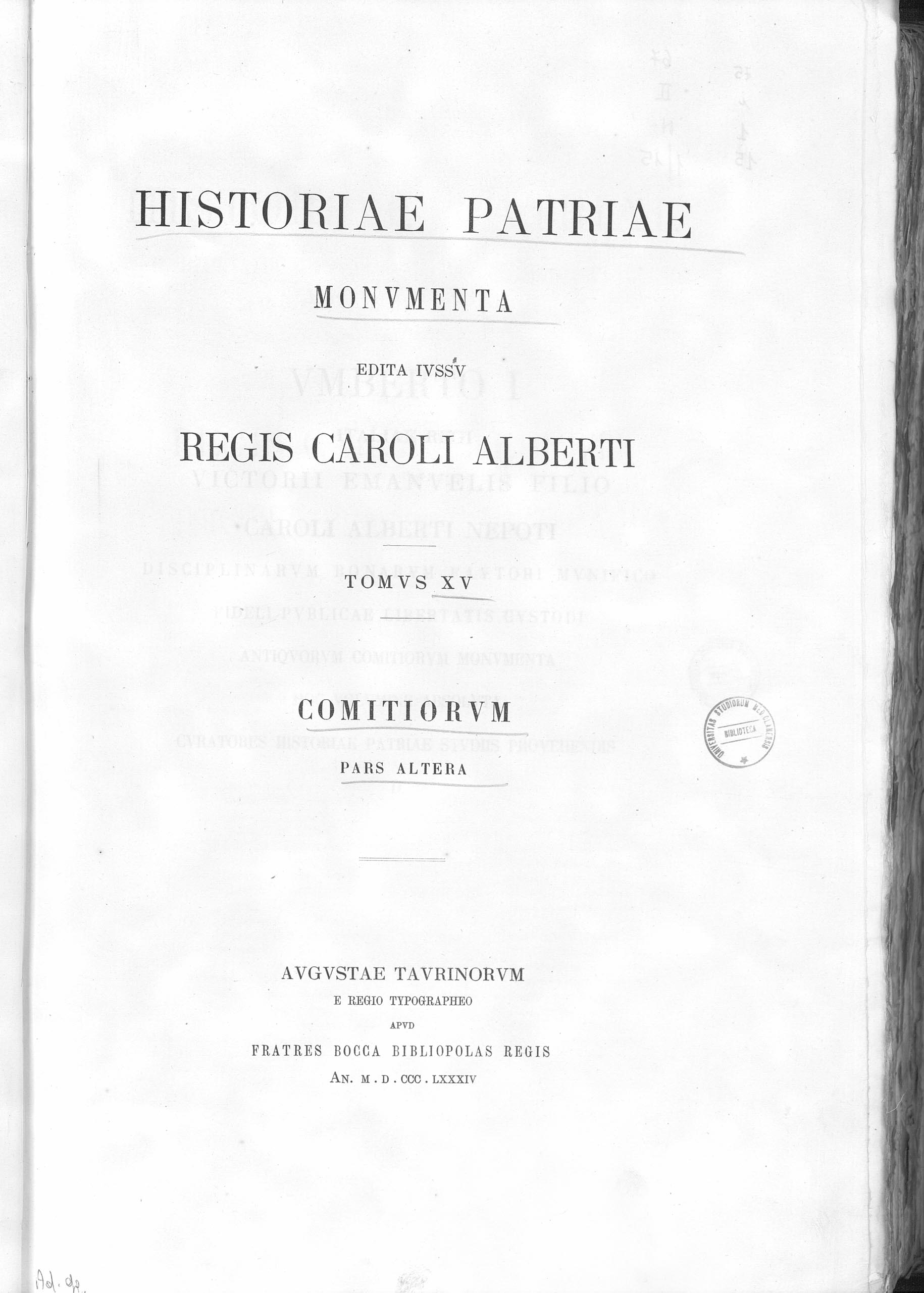
Vol. XV: Comitiorum, I, Pars altera (1884)

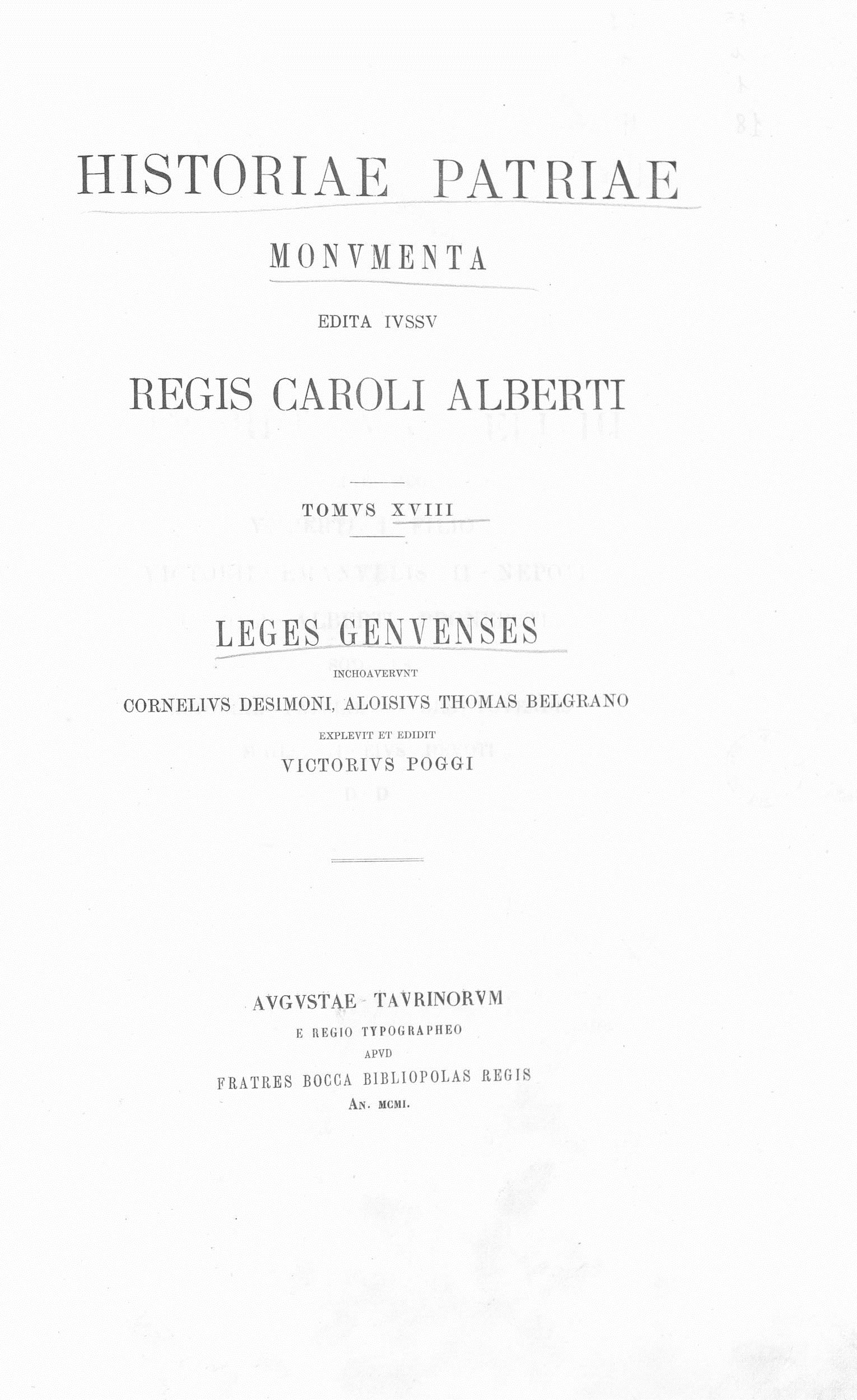
Vol XVIII: Leges genuenses (1901)

== Other projects ==
- Wikimedia Commons holds images or other files on Historiae Patriae Monumenta
