= Cut-out (recording industry) =

Discounted or remaindered recordings

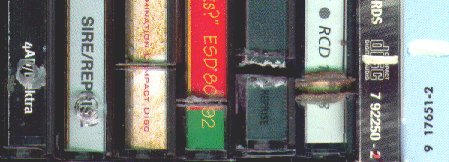
The spines of eight CDs with cut-out marks

In the recording industry, a cut-out refers to a deeply discounted or remaindered copy of an LP, 45 RPM single, cassette tape, compact disc or other item. This was and still is common in the U.S. and rather unknown in other parts of the world. Defacement of the packaging but not the media prevents a retailer or buyer from returning a product for an undiscounted credit.

== History ==
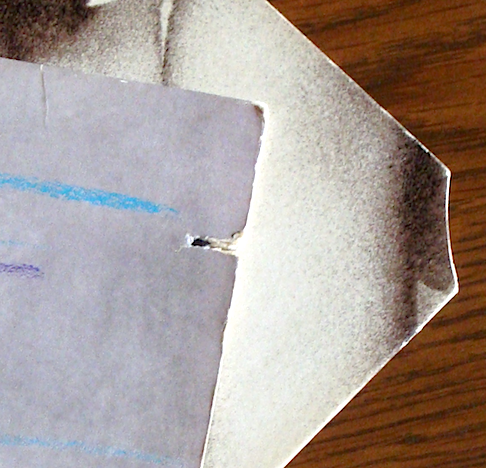
Two different ways of marking cut-out records on LP jackets

When LPs were the primary medium for the commercial distribution of sound recordings, manufacturers would cut the corner, punch a hole, or add a notch to the spine of the jacket of unsold records returned from retailers; these "cut-outs" might then be re-sold to record retailers or other sales outlets for sale at a discounted price. 45 RPM singles records were usually drilled with a hole through the label, or stamped "C.O." A special section of a record store devoted to such items was known as the "cut-out bin" or bargain bin.

As tapes and CDs supplanted LPs, the mechanisms for indicating a cut-out changed. On cassettes, a hole tended to be punched or burned through the case and through its printed insert. On CDs (a practice that continues today), a section of varying size is taken out of the spine of the jewel case and its paper track listing. Other methods of cutting CDs include punching a hole through the UPC and clipping a corner off of the front insert.

Cut-outs are typically wholesaled to retailers as non-returnable items, meaning that the store cannot send them back to the distributor for a refund. The marking also serves to prevent the retailer from attempting to sell the discounted item at the original full price. Recording artists also typically do not get full royalties from cut-outs, since they are sold at a "promotional" cost, far less than the retail price. Except for the physical damage to the liner notes and/or outer case, the actual disc (LP or CD) is generally unharmed by the cut-out process, and sounds exactly the same as the originally sold recording.

Besides the use by means of a discounted item, the cut-out method is also commonly used by record companies to mark copies that were sent out for promotional use to third parties like radio stations and DJs. This prevents them from being returned via the retail channel for a refund.

A similar cut-out procedure was practiced with the laserdisc home video format as well as the 8-track tape cartridge. The latter format would usually have a small dimple-like hole burned into the cartridge's bottom label area, usually made with a heated soldering iron. The practice has also been extended to DVDs, Blu-ray discs, and other home video physical formats.

== Dakou cassettes and CDs in China ==
Cut-out (Chinese: 打口; pinyin: dǎkǒu) cassettes and CDs played an important role in the development of rock music in China. Dakou was the major, and often the only, source of foreign rock and pop music in China.

== See also ==
- Remaindered book
- Stripped book
