= Edition (book) =

Book publishing

The bibliographical definition of an edition is all copies of a book printed from substantially the same setting of type, including all minor typographical variants.

== First edition ==
Illustrated title page by Hammatt Billings for volume I of Uncle Tom's Cabin, first edition, Boston: John P. Jewett and Company, 1852

According to the definition of edition above, a book printed today, by the same publisher, and from the same type as when it was first published, is still the first edition of that book to a bibliographer. However, book collectors generally use the term first edition to mean specifically the first print run of the first edition (a.k.a. "first edition, first impression"). Since World War II, books often include a number line (printer's key) that indicates the print run.

A "first edition" per se is not a valuable collectible book. A popular work may be published and reprinted over time by many publishers, and in a variety of formats. There will be a first edition of each, which the publisher may cite on the copyright page, such as: "First mass market paperback edition". The first edition of a facsimile reprint is the reprint publisher's first edition, but not the first edition of the work itself.

The Independent Online Booksellers Association has A First Edition Primer that discusses several aspects of identifying first editions including publishing and specific publishers way of designating first editions.

=== Bibliographical definition ===
The classic explanation of edition was given by Fredson Bowers in Principles of Bibliographical Description (1949). Bowers wrote that an edition is "the whole number of copies printed at any time or times from substantially the same setting of type-pages," including "all issues and variant states existing within its basic type-setting, as well as all impressions."

Publishers often use the same typesetting for the hardcover and trade paperback versions of a book. These books have different covers, the title page and copyright page may differ, and the page margin sizes may differ (same type area, smaller trim), but to a bibliographer they are the same edition.

From time to time, readers may observe an error in the text (or, in the days of metal type, a piece of broken type), and report these to the publisher. The publisher typically keeps these "reprint corrections" in a file pending demand for a new print run of the edition, and before the new run is printed, they will be entered.

The method of entry depends on the method of typesetting. For letterpress metal, it typically meant resetting a few characters or a line or two. For linotype, it meant casting a new line for any line with a change in it. With film, it involved cutting out a bit of the film and inserting a new bit. In an electronic file, it means entering the changes digitally.

Such minor changes do not constitute a new edition, but introduce typographical variations within an edition, which are of interest to collectors.

=== Collectors' definition ===
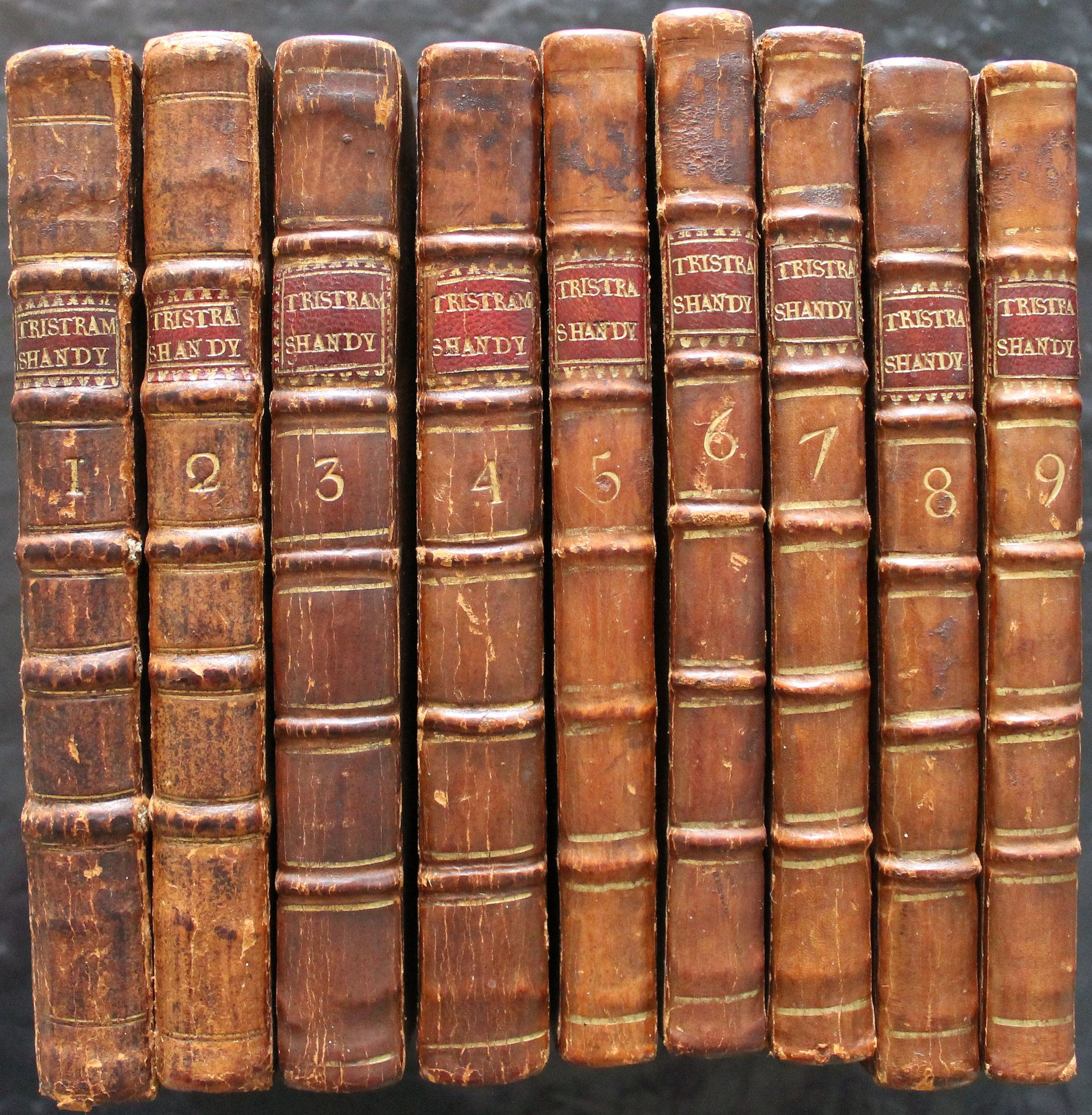
First editions of Laurence Sterne's Tristram Shandy

A common complaint of book collectors is that the bibliographer's definition is used in a book-collecting context. For example, J. D. Salinger's The Catcher in the Rye as of 2016 remains in print in hardcover. The type is the same as the 1951 first printing, therefore all hardcover copies are, for the bibliographer, the first edition. Collectors would use the term for the first printing only.

First edition most often refers to the first commercial publication of a work between its own covers, even if it was first printed in a periodical: the complete text of Ernest Hemingway's The Old Man and the Sea appeared in the September 1, 1952, issue of Life, yet the generally accepted "first" edition is the hardcover book Scribner's published on September 8, 1952.

The term "first trade edition," refers to the earliest edition of a book offered for sale to the general public in book stores. For example, Upton Sinclair's 1906 novel The Jungle was published in two variant forms. A "Sustainers' Edition", published by the Jungle Publishing Company, was sent to subscribers who had advanced funds to Sinclair. The first trade edition was published by Doubleday, Page to be sold in bookstores.

Many book collectors place maximum value on the earliest bound copies of a book—promotional advance copies, bound galleys, uncorrected proofs, and advance reading copies sent by publishers to book reviewers and booksellers. It is true that these are rarer than the production copies; but given that these were not printed from a different setting of type (just the opposite; the main purpose of galleys and proofs is to double-check the typeset matter that will be used for production), they are not different editions.

=== Publisher definitions ===
Publishers use "first edition" according to their own purposes, and consequently among them the designation is used very inconsistently. The "first edition" of a trade book may be the first iteration of the work printed by the publisher in question or the first iteration of the work that includes a specific set of illustrations or editorial commentary. This means that a "second edition" and subsequent "third edition" will not entail a huge shift from the initial edition but simply contain updates and revisions required with time.

Publishers of non-fiction, academic works, and textbooks generally distinguish between revisions of the text of the work, by typically citing the dates of the first and latest editions of the work in the copyright page. Exceptions to this rule of thumb include denominating as a "second edition" a new textbook that has a different format, title, or author because a previous textbook that shares only the same subject matter as the "second edition" is considered the first edition. The reason for this stretch of the definition is often for the short-term marketing advantage of the new textbook, because, although first editions are often considered more valuable than later editions to book collectors, being a subsequent edition of a previous textbook gives the impression that the textbook denominated as a subsequent edition is more authoritative.

== Other types ==
=== Revised edition ===
Publishers sometimes denominate a new iteration of a work a "revised edition" or the "(N)th edition, revised" when the previous iteration has been editorially revised or updated yet the author or publisher does not want to denominate it the "(N+1)th edition" ("N" being the number of the previous edition) for some subjective reason. Conversely, a new iteration of a work that is not substantially different may be denominated a "new edition" or the "(N+1)th edition".

The qualitative difference between a "revised edition" and a "new edition" is subjective. This is analogous to the way that software publishers may denominate an iteration "version 3.7" and the subsequent updated iteration "version 4" instead of "version 3.8". The subjective judgment of the degree of the significance of the change made with the new iteration or the perceived marketing advantage of designating the new iteration as a specific number determines how the new iteration is numbered.

Therefore, the designation "revised edition" does not designate any quality or quantity of revision with certainty.

=== Revised and updated edition ===
When a non-fiction book is first published it sometimes instigates more research on its subject. The author may determine that new information justifies the revision of the book. A new iteration of the book would be published as a new edition, which may be denominated a "revised and updated edition". However, as with the denomination of "revised edition", the use of "revised and updated edition" manifests only the subjective choice of the publisher, which may be different from the publisher of a previous "revised edition" of the same work.

=== Co-edition ===
The basic definition of a co-edition is when two publishing houses publish the same edition of a book (or equivalent versions of an edition, for example, translated versions), simultaneously or near-simultaneously, usually in different countries. English and American editions may differ in spelling, and they sometimes have different titles. Some examples:

- An English-language edition, from the same plates, films, or files, may be published in different anglophone countries by different publishing companies. For example, Arms & Armour Press in the UK and Stackpole Books in the U.S. published co-editions of various monographs on military matters.
- A French-language novel published in France this year by a French publisher could become an English-language translation published in the U.S. next year by a U.S. publisher.

The motivation for co-editions has often been to use the existing distribution systems of the different publishers in each country rather than establishing new distribution systems.

Advancing IT and the globalization of publishing have been blurring the lines of what co-edition means. For example, anything published online is effectively published worldwide. Also, large multinational publishers now have existing distribution systems for their hardcopy books in many countries, so they don't need to partner with other companies. They may issue a book under a different imprint for each country, but the imprints are parts of the same parent corporation. The actual manufacturing of the books may be done in China regardless of where the copies will be sold.

=== e-dition ===
The term e-dition, a play on the e-for-electronic prefix, has been used by various publishers to refer to various ideas, which include:

- The hardcopy book's content posted online, fully searchable
- Supplemental online-only content for buyers of the hardcopy book
- Online-only publishing (no hardcopy distribution)
- Proprietary-format digital publication (e-books) for use in specialized hardware for reading the book (e-book readers)

=== Library edition ===
A library edition may appear to be the same as copies appearing in shops and almost certainly uses the same setting. However, the binding and hinges are made extra strong to allow for the greater wear and tear in library books. This is analogous to the "police and taxi" packages for automobiles, in which heavier brakes and other upgrades are made to withstand harsher-than-standard use and longer duty cycles.

=== Book club edition ===
A popular book is sometimes re-issued under the imprint of a book club. Often it is a new setting and with cheaper paper and binding. Any photographic illustrations in the original are either absent or reduced in number. Book club editions are sold to members at a good discount compared with the original issue price.

=== Cheap edition ===
After a book has exhausted the market at the high original price a publisher may issue a cheap edition themselves or sell the rights on to another publisher who will produce the book. A cheap edition typically uses a low-cost paper and is a paperback but they can be hardback. Also typically the size of the font is reduced to fit more words on a page to reduce the overall cost of the book. Naturally, for a cheap edition the author will receive a lower royalty but that may be compensated for by a greater volume of sales.

=== Colonial edition ===
During the peak of the British Empire, cheap editions of novels published in Britain would often be produced for sale in the colonies before other editions of the books were sold. The rationale was that books took a long time to export to the colonies, that readership in those settlements was avid, and that books were an effective means to disseminate British values. Australia was by far the largest consumer of colonial editions. Macmillan (London) published the largest number of colonial edition titles. They began in 1843 and persisted (in terms of pricing and trade) until the 1970s.

=== Cadet edition ===
A cadet edition is a cut down version of a book which is more simply written. It is intended for young readers but adults can read it too.

=== Large print edition ===
These editions are typically library editions but the font size of the text is much larger than usual so that persons with poor eyesight (often older persons) can more easily read the book. The large print books tend to be of a uniform size.

=== Critical edition ===
A critical edition is a scholarly publication, containing commentary, critique, and sometimes a full developmental history of the work from all available sources.

== Numbering ==
Because of the variation in quality, lower-numbered prints in an edition are sometimes favored as superior, especially with older works where the image was struck until the plate wore out. However the numbering of impressions in fact may well not equate at all to the sequence in which they were printed, and may often be the reverse of it.

In later times, printmakers recognized the value of limiting the size of an edition and including the volume of the edition in the print number (e.g., "15/30" for the 15th print in an edition of 30). Tight controls on the process to limit or eliminate variation in quality have become the norm. In monotyping, a technique where only two impressions at most can be taken, prints may be numbered 1/1, or marked "unique". Artists usually print an edition much smaller than the plate allows, both for marketing reasons and to keep the edition comfortably within the lifespan of the plate. Specific steps may also be taken to strengthen the plate, such as electroplating intaglio images, which uses an electric process to put a very thin coat of a stronger metal onto a plate of a weaker metal.

The conventions for numbering prints are well-established, a limited edition is normally hand signed and numbered by the artist, typically in pencil, in the form (e.g.): 14/100. The first number is the number of the print itself. The second number is the number of overall prints the artist will print of that image. The lower the second number is, the more valuable and collectible the limited editions are likely to be, within whatever their price range is. Other marks may indicate that a print has been made in addition to the numbered prints of an edition. Artist's proofs are marked "A. P." or "P/A", sometimes E. A. or E. d'A. (épreuve d'artiste); monoprints and uniquely hand-altered prints are marked "unique"; prints that are given to someone or are for some reason unsuitable for sale are marked "H. C." or "H/C", meaning "hors de commerce", not for sale. These are usually prints reserved for the publisher, like Artist's Proofs. The printer is also often allowed to retain some proof impressions; these are marked "P. P." Finally, a master image may be printed against which the members of the edition are compared for quality: these are marked as "bon à tirer" or "BAT" ("good to print" in French). In all, the number of the main edition can represent 50% or less of the total number of good impressions taken.

Professional artist printmakers will sometimes limit an edition to several artist's proof copies, including a "bon à tirer" print and then one unique copy designated as a "one-off" or "1/1" or "one/off".

== Republication ==
Many commercially successful books have been republished, either by their original or other imprints. For this reason if a popular book is searched for in a large bookseller such as Amazon.com or a large library catalog such as WorldCat, often an array of different copyright years, publishers, editions, formats (hardcover, softcover, trade, and mass market), and so forth are observed. Because no universal authority or convention determines the exact distinction between a "reprinting" and "republishing" and whether a republishing is a different "edition", the denotation of such denominations is ambiguous, at least at first glance.

== Legal status ==
=== UK ===
Since 1956, typographical arrangements of published editions are protected by copyright law. Copyright, Designs and Patents Act 1988 defines a published edition to mean a published edition of the whole or any part of one or more literary, dramatic or musical works. (Note: Duration Directive of the EU permits member states to create a publishers' right in critical and scientific works which have fallen into the public domain.)

It thus protects the publisher's investment in typesetting, as well as the processes of design and selection that are reflected in the appearance of the text. (Note: See Newspaper Licensing Agency v. Marks & Spencer [2000]) It also covers modern editions of public domain works (such as the complete works of Shakespeare), and prohibits the reproduction of the layout (but not the work itself).

== See also ==
- Editio princeps – essentially, the first printed edition of classical or medieval works
- Publication
- Publication right
- Remaindered book

== Bibliography ==
- Bowers, Fredson. Principles of Bibliographical Description, Winchester and New Castle, Delaware: St Paul's Bibliographies and Oak Knoll Press, 2005 (reprint edition, first published in 1949).
