= Print circulation =

Number of printed copies of a publication

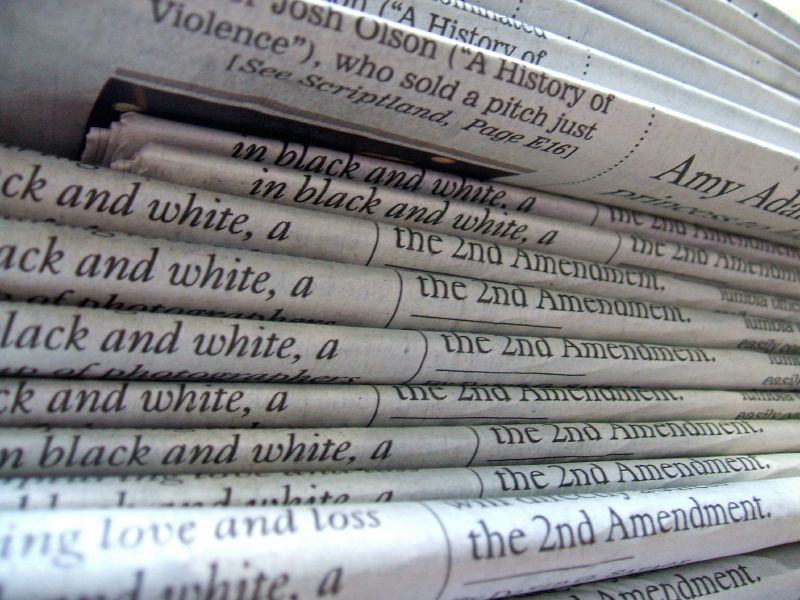
Part of a newspaper print circulation

Print circulation is the average number of copies of a publication. The number of copies of a non-periodical publication (such as a book) is usually called a print run. Circulation is not always the same as copies sold, often called paid circulation, since some issues are distributed without cost to the reader. Readership figures are usually higher than circulation figures because of the assumption that a typical copy is read by more than one person.

== Concept ==
Print circulation is a good proxy measure of print readership and is thus one of the principal factors used to set print advertising rates (prices). In many countries, circulations are audited by independent bodies such as the Audit Bureau of Circulations to assure advertisers that a given newspaper does reach the number of people claimed by the publisher. There are international open access directories such as Mondo Times, but these generally rely on numbers reported by newspapers themselves.

== World newspapers with the largest circulation ==
The World Association of Newspapers and News Publishers (WAN-IFRA) publishes a list of newspapers with the largest circulation. In 2011, India led the world in terms of newspaper circulation with nearly 330 million newspapers circulated daily. In 2010, China topped the list in term of total newspaper circulation with 110.78 million a day; India, in second, with 100.993 million; followed by Japan, with 50.4 million; the United States, with 48.5 million; and Germany, with 19.7 million. In the 2019 survey, among the top 10 newspapers, all were Asian newspapers and four were Japanese.

The Japanese Yomiuri Shimbun (読売新聞) and Asahi Shimbun (朝日新聞) are the largest circulated newspapers in the world. The Times of India is the largest circulated English-language daily newspaper in the world, across all formats (broadsheet, compact, Berliner and online). Reference News (参考消息) is the most popular paper in China.

According to the Guinness Book of Records, the daily circulation of the Soviet newspaper Komsomolskaya Pravda exceeded 21,500,000 in 1990, while the Soviet weekly Argumenty i Fakty boasted a circulation of 33,500,000 in 1991.

In many developed countries, print circulation is falling due to social and technological changes such as the availability of news on the internet. On the other hand, in some developing countries circulation is increasing as these factors are more than cancelled out by rising incomes, population, and literacy.

== Individual countries ==
=== Australia ===
The Herald Sun has the highest circulation in Australia. Based in one of the country's two major cities, Melbourne, it is the result of the amalgamation of the original Sun and Herald newspapers.

=== Belgium ===
The Belgian institution CIM (Centre for Information about Media) publishes national circulation figures for all written, audiovisual and web-based media in Belgium. The top ten best-selling papers according to their website are Het Laatste Nieuws, 317,715; Het Nieuwsblad, 245,209; SUD Presse (group of papers focused on community specific content), 147,749; Het Belang van Limburg, 121,428; Le Soir, 113,780; Vers l'avenir, 109,287 (group of papers focused on community specific content); La Dernière Heure, 107,583; De Standaard, 104,758.

=== Canada ===
The most widely read paper in the country is the Toronto Star, which, as of the six-month period ending on March 31, 2007, averaged 634,886 copies sold on Saturday, 436,694 Monday to Friday, and 442,265 on Sunday. The second most widely read paper is Toronto-based national newspaper The Globe and Mail, which averaged 374,000 copies on Saturdays, and 303,000 Monday to Friday. The most widely read French-language newspaper is Le Journal de Montréal, which averaged 319,899 copies on Saturday, 267,404 Monday to Friday, and 264,733 on Sunday. Unlike in the United States, newspapers in Canada published their biggest and mostly widely read editions on Saturdays.

=== India ===
The Audit Bureau of Circulations shows that the largest read local language newspapers to be Dainik Bhaskar (with 4.320 million readers) and Dainik Jagran (with 3.410 million readers), both published in Hindi. The Times of India is the most widely read English language newspaper (3.029 million), followed by Malayala Manorama (2.370 million), Amar Ujala (2.067 million), Hindustan Times (1.132 million), Eenadu (1.732 million), Daily Thanthi is a Tamil daily (1.498 million), Anandabazar Patrika is Bengali language newspaper (1.075 million). Malayala Manorama, which is published in Malayalam from Kerala, currently has a readership of over 2.370 million (with a circulation base of over 2.4 million copies) has the most circulation in other languages.

=== Japan ===
The 2022 circulation figures for the morning and evening editions of Japan's newspapers: Yomiuri Shimbun, 6,870,000; the Asahi Shimbun, 5,890,000; Mainichi Shimbun, 2,572,000; Nihon Keizai Shimbun, 1,731,000; Chunichi Shimbun/Tokyo Shimbun, 2,871,000; Sankei Shimbun, 1,330,000; Nikkan Sports, 1,661,828; Hokkaido Shimbun, 1,896,594; Shizuoka Shimbun, 1,479,000.

=== Norway ===
The Norwegian Media Businesses' Association publishes national circulation figures for every newspaper in Norway every year. In 2011 the most read newspaper was the Oslo-based national newspaper Aftenposten, with a circulation of 235,795 followed by the tabloid Verdens Gang with 211,588. The local evening newspaper Aften averages 101,574 and the tabloid Dagbladet had 98,989 readers. The financial newspaper Dagens Næringsliv averaged 82,595. In the top ten list it is followed by five local newspapers: Bergens Tidende, 79,467; Adresseavisen, 71,657; Stavanger Aftenblad, 63,283; Fædrelandsvennen, 36,604 and Drammens Tidende, 33,352.

=== Turkey ===
As of August 2016, the top 6 best-selling papers are respectively: Hürriyet, 340,898; Sözcü, 322,829; Sabah, 313,989; Posta, 302,919; Habertürk, 253,256 and Milliyet, 143,577.

=== United Kingdom ===
According to the Audit Bureau of Circulations the newspaper with the UK's highest paid circulation is the Daily Mail at 652,866 as of February 2025.

=== United States ===
The heyday of the newspaper industry was the 1940s, but the percentage of Americans reading newspapers began to decline with the increased competition from radio, television and, more recently, the Internet. A growing population helped the absolute circulation numbers continue to increase until the 1970s, where it remained stable until the 1990s, when absolute circulation numbers began declining.

Newspaper circulation numbers are reported to the Alliance for Audited Media. The best-selling papers in America, measured by combined daily average circulation as of March 31, 2013, are the Wall Street Journal with 2,378,827 in circulation; The New York Times at 1,865,318; and USA Today with 1,674,306. Overall, for the 593 reporting newspapers, daily circulation declined 0.7 percent year-over-year between March 2012 and March 2013. Sunday circulation was down 1.4 percent over the same period.

== See also ==
- List of newspapers by circulation
- List of magazines by circulation
- Newspaper delivery: The circulation department of a newspaper, in addition to soliciting subscriptions, also distributes them to subscribers to the print edition. The last step is newspaper delivery consisting of newspaper routes run either by motor vehicle or traditional adolescent "paper boys."
- Printer's key
