= Remaindered book =

Overstocked & marked printed book

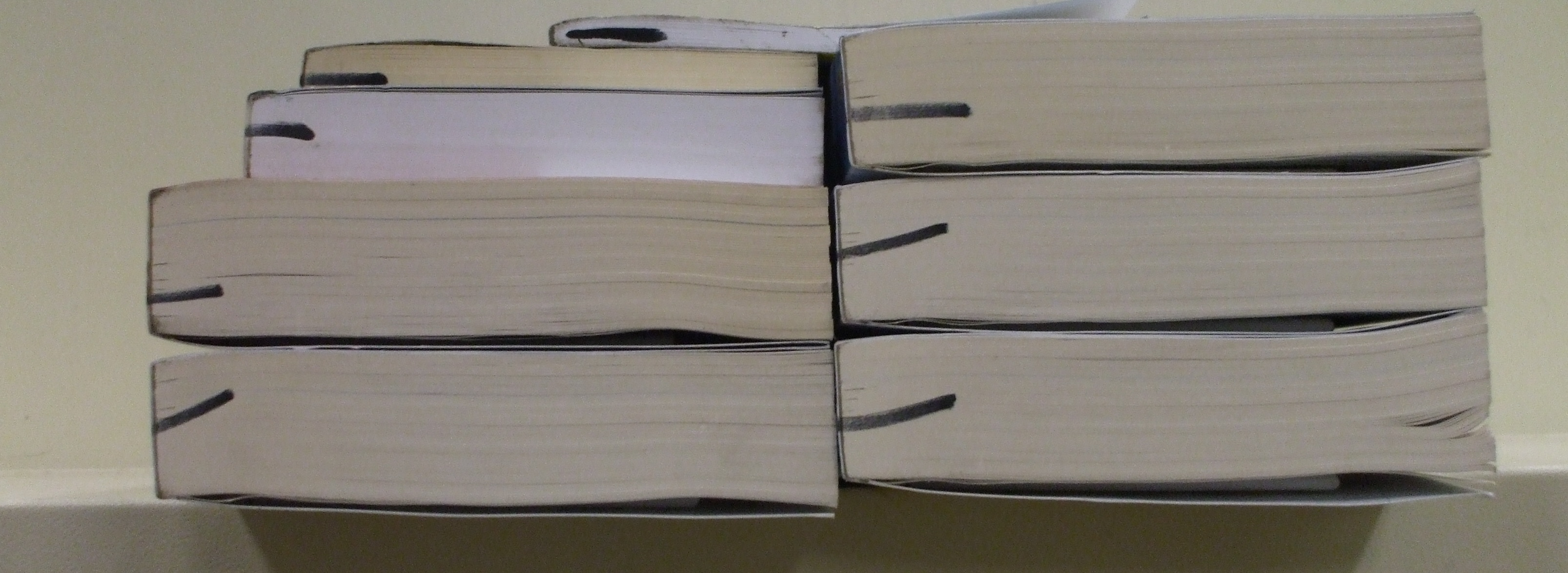
Stack of books with remaindering markings on the bottom next to the spine

Remaindered books or remainders are printed books that are no longer selling well, and the remaining unsold copies of which are liquidated by the publisher at greatly reduced prices. While publishers may take a net loss on the sales of such books, they are able to recover at least some of their sunk costs on the sale and to clear out space in the warehouses.

Copies of remaindered books may be marked by the publisher, distributor, or bookseller to prevent them from being returned. "Remainder marks" have varied over the years, but today most remainders are marked with a stroke with a felt-tipped marker across the top or bottom of the book's pages, near the spine.

Typically, only hardcovers and trade paperbacks (paperback books, often larger than "pocket" paperbacks, sold "to the trade" or directly to sales outlets) are remaindered. Poorly selling mass-market paperbacks ("pocket" paperback books sold through a third-party distributor) usually become stripped books rather than remainders. A typical remaindered book will be purchased far below the retail price by a specialist in remainders and resold for a fraction of the retail price.

== In the United States ==
Since Thor Power Tool Company v. Commissioner of Internal Revenue, books in the United States have been remaindered much earlier and in greater quantities than prior to the 1979 decision. Since then, the number of unsold books that have simply been destroyed (by being trashed, burned, or recycled) instead of being sold at a large reduction has also risen greatly.

== See also ==
- Cut-out (recording industry)
