= Printer's key =

Typesetting practice

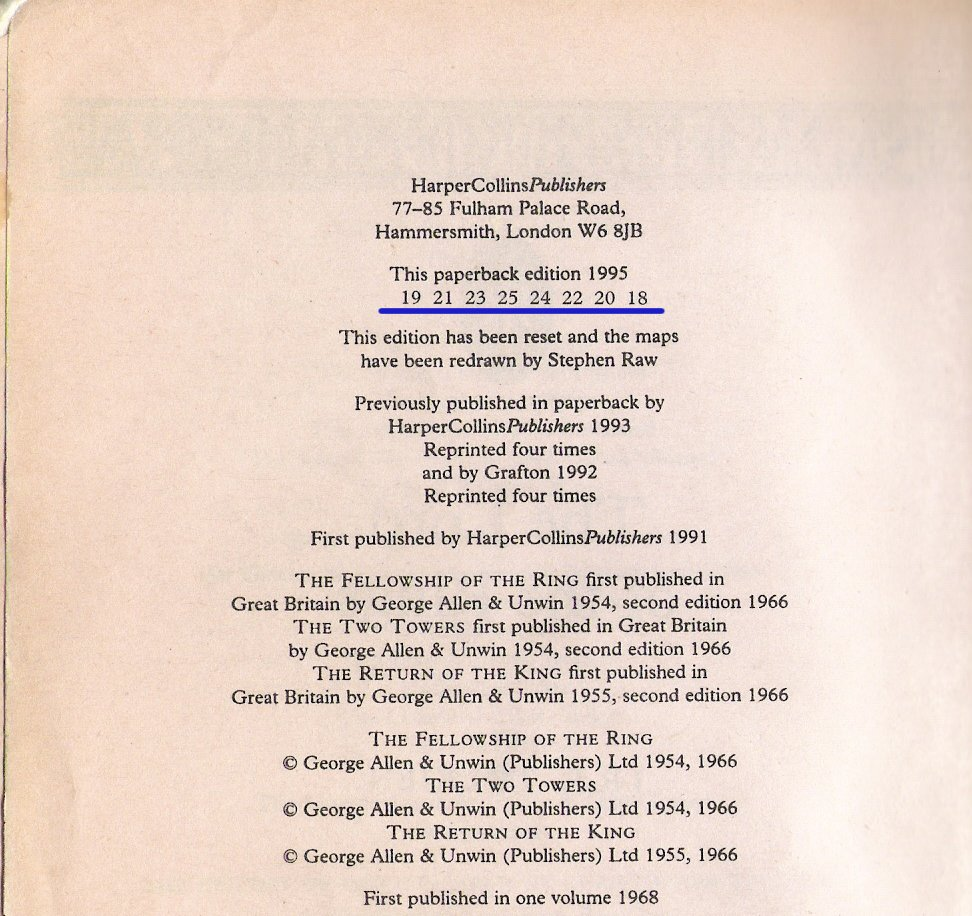
A copyright page with the printer's key underlined. This version of the book is the eighteenth printing.

The printer's key, also known as the number line, is a line of text printed on a book's copyright page (often the verso of the title page, especially in English-language publishing) used to indicate the print run of the particular edition. The convention appears in titles published around the middle of the 20th century; it became common practice after 1970.

An example follows:

1 2 3 4 5 6 7 8 9 10

This is how the printer's key may appear in the first print run of a book. In this common example numbers are removed with subsequent printings, so if "1" is seen then the book is the first printing of that edition. If it is the second printing then the "1" is removed, meaning that the lowest number seen will be "2".

== Examples ==
Usually, the printer's key is a series of non-repeating characters (numbers or letters). However its structure or presentation is not uniform, as shown in the following examples.

The series may be in descending or ascending sequence:

10 9 8 7 6 5 4 3 2 1

1 2 3 4 5 6 7 8 9 10

a b c d e f g h i j k

In some cases, rather than follow in unidirectional sequence, the numbers may alternate from left to right:

2 4 6 8 10 9 7 5 3 1

(This is so that, in later editions, the numbers will remain relatively centred on the page.)

In other cases, number lines may include a date segment consisting of two-digit consecutive-year codes:

2 3 4 5 6 73 72 71 70

This indicates a second printing (or second impression) and that it occurred in 1970. Specifically, it is the particular imprint's second impression of the edition.

When the publisher outsources the printing to a contractor, a code identifying the contracting printer may occasionally be shown:

3 4 5 6 7 8 9 10 APC 00 99 98 97 96

The hypothetical printer's key above means

- third printing
- printed in 1996
- contracted to Acme Printing Corporation.

The examples above are not exhaustive; other key configurations may be used, especially in editions published following the advent of digital printing and print on demand.

== First edition vs. first printing ==
Bibliographers usually define a first edition as all printings from substantially the same type setting, no matter how many printings are done. Book collectors tend to define first edition as the first printing of the first edition.

== Why key characters are removed rather than added ==
With each successive reprint, the publisher needs to instruct the printer to change the impression character. In practice, if the plates (in offset printing) have been kept, a character can be erased, but nothing can be added. In this arrangement, all the printer needs to do is "rub off" the last character in the sequence. Changing only the outer character requires the fewest possible changes to the page of characters, which means the smallest possible charge to the publisher. In the days of letterpress printing, where each character was a metal block, all the printer had to do was to pick out the relevant block(s) from the "sheet"; the remaining stack of blocks, which had been laboriously laid out when the page was first set up, could then be inked for the reprint. In the case of a Linotype slug, the lowest character could be filed off and the slug reused. (Note: In theory; linotype operators sometimes used files (and other tools) in order to make fine adjustments.) For offset printing with metal plates, the character can be erased without damaging the rest of the plate. In each case, the change is minimal. (Note: Although a number line's date segment (if it exists) follows the changes in the print run sequence, it may not necessarily change at the same rate or the same time.)

== Digital typesetting and printing ==
In modern computer to plate typesetting and digital printing the entire printer's key may be easily re-imaged (instead of reset by erasing or removing individual characters). This allows additional key configurations.
