= Half-title =

Page carrying nothing but the title of a book

Half-title page of Picturesque New Guinea (1887), with ornamentation above and below the title

The half-title or bastard title is a page carrying nothing but the title of a book—as opposed to the title page, which also lists subtitle, author, publisher and edition. The half-title is usually counted as the first page (p. i) in a printed book. The half-title can have some ornamentation of the book's title, or it can be plain text.

The purpose of the half-title page is to protect the full title page and its traditional counterpart, the frontispiece, during the bookbinding process. When the completed interior pages of the book are bound together to form the book block, the half-title page serves as the outermost layer of paper at the front of the book. Several hundreds or thousands of book blocks may need to be moved or stored for a period of time before they are bound into their covers, during which the half-title page protects the more intricately designed pages that follow from rubbing and dust.

Archaic uses of the terms half-title and bastard title may refer to two separate pages on both sides of the full title page that have been conflated in modern usage. Theodore Low De Vinne distinguished between half-title (by his definition, a "caption title") and bastard title in his series The Practice of Typography, saying:

The half-title should not be confounded with the bastard title. The half-title follows the title and begins the first page of text; the bastard title, usually a single line in capital letters, precedes the full title, and takes a separate leaf with blank verso.

== See also ==
- Book design
