= Stripped book =

Paperback with its cover removed

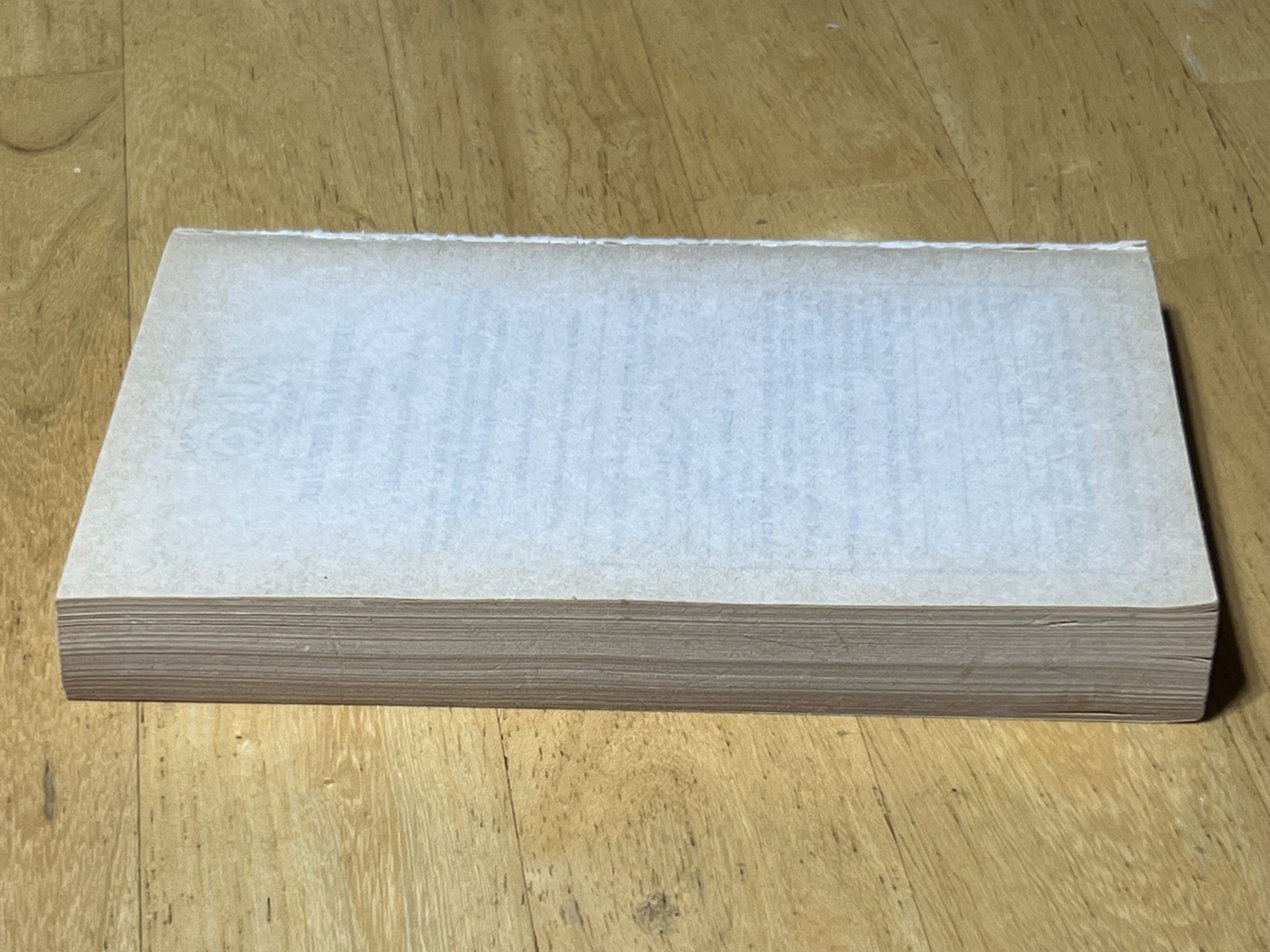
An example of a stripped book.

A stripped book is a mass market paperback that has been stripped of its cover in order to be recycled. The covers are returned to the publisher as evidence that the books have been destroyed and to obtain a credit on the purchase price. The books are meant to be destroyed by pulping but some find their way to street merchants, sometimes by illegal means, and are resold.

== See also ==
- Out-of-print book
- Remaindered book
