= Title page =

Page at or near the front of a book on which its publishing information is displayed

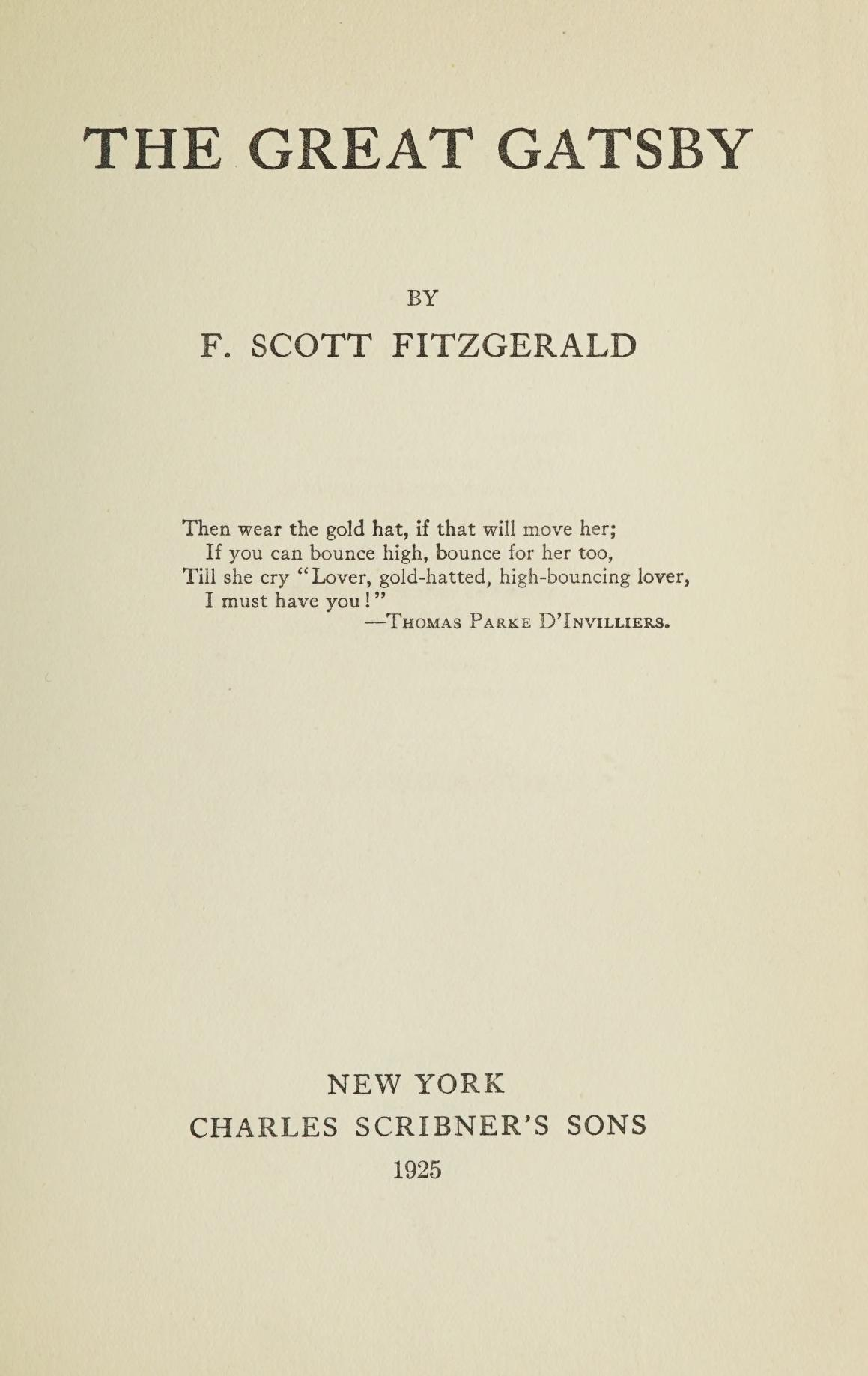
Title page of the 1925 first edition of The Great Gatsby by F. Scott Fitzgerald

The title page of a book, thesis or other written work is the page at or near the front which displays its title, subtitle, author, publisher, and edition, often artistically decorated. (A half title, by contrast, displays only the title of a work.)

The title page is one of the most important parts of the "front matter" or "preliminaries" of a book, as the data on it and its verso (together known as the "title leaf") are used to establish the "title proper and usually, though not necessarily, the statement of responsibility and the data relating to publication". This determines the way the book is cited in library catalogs and academic references.

The title page often shows the title of the work, the person or body responsible for its intellectual content, and the imprint, which contains the name and address of the book's publisher and its date of publication. Particularly in paperback editions it may contain a shorter title than the cover or lack a descriptive subtitle. Further information about the publication of the book, including its copyright information, is frequently printed on the verso of the title page. Also often included there are the ISBN and a "printer's key", also known as the "number line", which indicates the print run to which the volume belongs.

The first printed books, or incunabula, did not have title pages: the text simply begins on the first page, and the book is often identified by the initial words—the incipit—of the text proper. Other older books may have bibliographic information on the colophon at the end of the book.

The Bulla Cruciatae contra Turcos (1463) is the earliest use of a title on the first page. Margaret M. Smith's The Title-Page, Its Early Development, 1460-1510 provides the genesis and development of the title page.

== Contamination of historic books ==
In the 19th century, Paris green and similar arsenic pigments were often used on front and back covers, top, fore and bottom edges, title pages, book decorations, and in printed or manual colorations of illustrations of books. Since February 2024, several German libraries started to block public access to their stock of 19th century books to check for the degree of poisoning.

== See also ==
- Colophon
- Book design
- Half title
- Printer's key

== Publications ==
- Bertram, Gitta, Nils Büttner, and Claus Zittel, eds. 2021. Gateways to the Book: Frontispieces and Title Pages in Early Modern Europe. Leiden: Brill.
- Fowler, Alastair. 2017. The Mind of the Book: Pictorial Title Pages. First edition. Oxford, United Kingdom: Oxford University Press.
- Gilmont, J.-F, Vanautgaerden, A., Deraedt, F. (2008). La page de titre à la Renaissance : treize études suivies de cinquante-quatre pages de titre commentées et d'un lexique des termes relatifs à la page de titre. Brepols.
- Morison, Stanley, Brooke Crutchley, and Kenneth Day. 1963. The Typographic Book, 1450-1935: A Study of Fine Typography through Five Centuries, Exhibited in Upwards of Three Hundred and Fifty Title and Text Pages Drawn from Presses Working in the European Tradition. Chicago: University of Chicago Press.
- Smith, Margaret M. (2000). The title-page : its early development, 1460-1510. Oak Knoll.
