= PaintShop Pro =

Raster and vector graphics editor

- Corel PaintShop Pro Photo X2 in Windows Vista
- Original author: Jasc Software, Inc.
- Developer: Corel
- Release: August 1990; 35 years ago
- Stable release: 2023 / September 9, 2022; 3 years ago
- Operating system: Windows 7 and later
- Platform: IA-32, x64
- Type: Raster graphics editor, vector graphics editor
- License: Shareware
- Website: www.paintshoppro.com/en/

PaintShop Pro (PSP) is a raster and vector graphics editor for Microsoft Windows. It was originally published by Jasc Software. In October 2004, Corel purchased Jasc Software and the distribution rights to PaintShop Pro. PSP functionality can be extended by Photoshop-compatible plugins.

The X-numbered editions have been sold in two versions: PaintShop Pro, which is the basic editing program, and PaintShop Pro Ultimate, which bundles in other standalone programs, additional artistic tools and/or plugins. The particular bundled programs have varied with each numbered version and have not been sold by Corel as separate products.

From release 8.00 onwards PSP came with an interface for automating tasks with scripts written in Python.

== History ==
Paint Shop Pro 1.0 (pictured here running on Windows XP) was released in 1992 for Windows 3.1.

Originally called GIF2PCX, the software was a file conversion utility, conceived by Robert Voit, used to move images between the major online platforms of the time, Compuserve and AOL. Each platform had their own file format for images, so the utility allowed users to share images on either platform. When basic image editing was added, the name was changed to Paint Shop. The first version, 1.0, supported image conversions picture converter between BMP, GIF and PCX formats, and basic full-image enhancements like changing brightness and contrast. Paint Shop 1.0 was released by Robert Voit in August 1990. The name was changed to Paint Shop Pro when full painting, such as with variable sized brushes, was added to the product. Paint Shop was originally distributed as shareware and is still available at many download sites (4.12 being a popular version). Most newer versions are only commercially available although some have been distributed in the United Kingdom in computer magazine CDs after they became obsolete.

PaintShop Pro 5 added support for layers as well as CMYK and HSL colour modes, included JASC Animation Shop for creating animations and in fact was marketed as "Paint Shop Pro 5.0 with Animation Shop". PaintShop Pro X6 was the first to be available as a native 64-bit version (purchase includes both versions). PaintShop Pro X7 includes content-aware features such as "Magic Fill" and "Smart Edge" as well as support for XMP sidecar files that preserve edit settings for raw formats.

From 2006 to 2011 (versions XI to X3), PaintShop Pro was marketed as "Corel Paint Shop Pro Photo". Having dropped the "Photo" part of the name in version X4, Paintshop Pro X5 was derived from Ulead Photo Explorer after Corel's acquisition of Ulead.

On November 28, 2007, Corel announced that the office in Eden Prairie, Minnesota, where Paint Shop Pro was created, would be shut down, with development moving to offices in California and China.

=== Version history ===
==== JASC Paint Shop releases: 1990?–1993 ====
In the table below, italicized dates are approximate, based on the earliest file timestamp on JASC or Corel's FTP server. Non-italicized dates are sourced from official press releases or notifications posted on JASC's web site.

Version number	Release date	Release notes
2.02	24 May 1991	Supports Windows 3.0 Standard/Enhanced mode. Supported file formats include: Windows BMP (1/4/8/24bpp, RGB/RLE4/RLE8 encoding); OS/2 BMP (1/4/8/24bpp, RGB encoding); GIF 87a (interlaced/progressive), GIF 89a (interlaced/progressive); GEM Paint IMG old style (1bpp), new style (1bpp); MacPaint MAC (1bpp, with/without header); Zsoft Paintbrush PCX version 0 (1bpp), version 2 (1/4bpp), version 3 (1/4bpp), version 5 (1/4/8bpp); Pictor/PCPaint PIC (1/4/8bpp); Windows RLE (4/8bpp); TIFF uncompressed (1/4/8/24bpp), Pack bits-compressed (1/4/8/24bpp), LZW-compressed (1/4/8/24bpp); WordPerfect WPG version 5.0 (1/4/8bpp), version 5.1 (1/4/8bpp)
3.0	14 August 1993	Last known version of Paint Shop. Changes over Paint Shop 2.02 includes: Relocated red/green/blue colour channel adjustment to Paint Shop Pro 2.0-style dialogue; Relocated brightness/contrast adjustment to Paint Shop Pro 2.0-style dialogue; Removal of restore orig. colour menu item; Addition of Selectable printer from local/network source; Addition of Built-in portrait/landscape print mode, paper size/source selection; Addition of undo operation; Addition of fit to full screen viewing; Addition of image resizing with aspect ratio preservation option; Addition of decreasing colour depth to 256 colours (8bpp); Addition of client area option for window capturing; Addition of file format support for: Dr. Halo CUT image (8bpp), PAL palette; Windows DIB (1/4/8/24bpp, RGB/RLE4/RLE8 encoding); OS/2 DIB (1/4/8/24bpp, RGB encoding); GIF 87a (1/4/8bpp, interlaced/progressive, 1st image data), GIF 89a (1/4/8bpp, interlaced/progressive, 1st image data); GEM Paint IMG old style (4/8bpp), new style (4/8bpp); Deluxe Paint LBM (1/4/8bpp); Microsoft Paint MSP old version (1bpp), new version (1bpp); Zsoft Paintbrush PCX version 5 (24bpp); CompuServe RLE (1bpp); Truevision Targa TGA (8/16/24/32bpp); TIFF Huffman-compressed (1bpp)

==== JASC Paint Shop Pro releases: 1990–2004 ====
Version number	Release date	Release notes
0.9	1990	
1.0	1992	
1.02a	1992	
1.02a	1993	
2.0	14 August 1993	Introduces the floating toolbar Changes over Paint Shop 2.02 includes: Object linking and embedding; Status bar showing image colour depth/dimensions, cursor location, image memory size, system memory size, activity progress bar.; Image acquisition from TWAIN-compliant device; Selectable import image size; Batch conversion; Selectable JIF/JPG compression level; Selectable DPI settings for PCX/TIFF/WPG; Selectable printer from local/network source; Built-in portrait/landscape print mode, paper size/source selection; Selectable screen capture time (immediately after selection/on right mouse click); Selectable undo buffer source (disabled/memory/disk); undo operation; emptying clipboard; zoom view (10:1 zoom out to 1:10 zoom in); Floating tools/histogram window; arbitrary image rotation (0-359 degrees in 1 degree increment), adding border to image, image resizing with aspect ratio preservation option, filtered image resizing; image filters (edge enhance, find edges, trace contour, blur, sharpen, soften, add noise (random/uniform), despeckle, dilate, emboss, erode, median, mosaic (square/non-square, 2-100 pixels), posterize (1-7 levels per channel), custom (1x1-5x5 matrix with custom division factor/bias, selectable colour channels, filter presets (includes enhance detail; import/export filter)); additional colour tools (gamma correction (0.01-4.99, with preview), highlight/shadow (with preview), solarize (with preview), palette edit/import/export (at 4/8bpp modes only), colour counter, decreasing colour depth (8/15/16bpp, X(17-256) colours), increasing colour depth), previews for brightness/contrast, red/green/blue colour channel adjustment; selectable colour channel when decreasing colour depth to 2 colours, additional options when decreasing colour depth to 16/256 colours (optimized/standard palette, nearest colour/ordered dither/error diffusion, boost marked colour, include Windows colours, reduce colour bleeding), additional options when decreasing colour depth to 32k/64k colours (nearest colour/ordered dither/error diffusion); additional capture options (client area/window capture, cursor capture); Multi-document interface, document window duplication; Histogram
2.01	15 November 1993	Changes to Paint Shop Pro 2.00 includes: Catalog ad for ImageCommander, and order forms for ImageCommander in Paint Shop Pro help file
3.0	August 1993?	
3.11	14 August 1995 (2-disk archive edition), 11 August 1997 (joined installer archive)	
3.12	1 July 1996 (16/32-bit compilation), 25 November 1996 (2-disk shareware archive edition)	Supports Win32s, Windows 95, Windows NT 4.0
4.0	1 July 1996 (registered)	First 32-bit only release. Changes from 3.12 includes: new paintbrush tool increases the user's artistic control by allowing custom settings of size, shape and paper texture for any brush type (pen, pencil, marker, crayon, chalk, charcoal, airbrush and paintbrush tool); Magic Wand tool supports capture an area of an image based on hue or brightness values; enhanced selections tool support adjusting overall opacity, designate a transparent color, or feather a selected area to create the illusion of a smooth edge; new file format support include: progressive encoded support for JPEG files; alpha channel support for the TIFF; alpha channel support for TGA; alpha channel support for PNG; A Channels feature that allows users to split or combine an image's RGB values, with a histogram window that displays red, green, blue and luminance channel information.; An Image Arithmetic feature for combining two images together using functions, channels and/or modifiers.; The ability to open the same image both at the zoom and whole-image level; An integrated image browser that permits visual searching of thumbnails and optional saving of thumbnails. Thumbnail size and selection colors are adjustable.; customizable toolbar; The option of performing multiple screen captures using the screen capture utility.; Increased system requirement to Intel 80486 or compatible CPU, 8 MB RAM, 5 MB hard drive space; Power pack version includes Kai's Power Tools SE.
4.10	3 September 1996 (registered upgrade patch)	Changes to 4.0 includes: GIF and PNG transparency previews; full screen viewing/editing; support for opening CMYK JPG files; ability to load third party plug-ins in the background as the program loads
4.12	10 January 1997 (shareware, registered upgrade patch)	
4.14	13 October 1997 (shareware, registered, registered upgrade patch)	Changes from 4.12 includes: improved memory performance; improved TIFF file format support; addresses stability issues reported by users
4.15	April 1998	
4.15 SE	April 1999	Bundled software edition distributed with some PC peripherals, as well as an issue of PC Advisor
5.0 beta	20 February 1998	Changes from version 4.14 includes: JASC Animation Shop; Newly supported image formats include Multi-layer PSD, Kodak PhotoPIX, FlashPix, Scitex CT, Pro Photo-CD, 24-bit IFF, PSP, and enhanced metafile; Support for layers editing, including blend mode controls, layer grouping, naming, visibility, transparency locking, user masking, and variable opacity.; User-customized viewable grids and display optional on-screen rulers.; Support for Kodak DC40, DC50 and DC120 digital cameras.; Support for pressure-sensitive drawing tablets.; Increased TWAIN support; printing CMYK color separations directly; multiple levels of undo (limited only by available hard disk space) with viewable history; New retouching brushes (dodge, burn, saturation, hue, lightness, and HSL to target modes); Added adjustable cropping and Free Form deformation tools; New filters (arithmetic, buttonize, blur, Gaussian blur, sharpening and unsharpening); New Picture Tubes brushes allows inserting a sequence of graphic elements such as letter blocks, pointing hands, rocks, old cars, candy, etc. as the user drags the mouse across an image; New colour manipulation tools (shifting of color ranges, splitting channels to HSL and CMYK, combining channels, Octree method for decreasing colors); Tree-based file browser based on c-style interface.; Supports Photoshop file format plug-ins (also supports custom input/output devices)
5.0	6 April 1998	Retail version of Paint Shop Pro 5. Japanese-language version was distributed by P & A, Inc.
5.01	June 1998	
5.03	May 1999	
6.00	13 September 1999	Changes to Paint Shop Pro 5 include: Included Jasc Animation Shop 2; New vector graphics tools (editable text tools, illustration tools with node editing); multiple color/transparency gradients with custom gradient profiles; New special effects (including Bevel, Weave, Blinds), deformations, and filters; JPEG and GIF optimizer tools; Multiple-image layout and printing; Adjustment layers for editable color corrections; Direct support for over 120 digital camera models; Enhanced visual Browser file management; OLE screen capture module; Multiple-level redo; Expanded palette functionality (improved Layer and Tool Options palettes); Enhanced user interface (including roll-up palettes and a recent colors picker); Enhanced integration between Paint Shop Pro 6 and Animation Shop 2; Expanded file format support; German version of Jasc Paint Shop Pro 6 was distributed by MicroBasic. Italian version of Jasc Paint Shop Pro 6 was distributed by Questar.
6.01	December 1999	
6.02	2000 February	
7.0 public beta	10 July 2000	Changes from Paint Shop Pro 6 includes: Included Jasc Animation Shop 3
7.0	21 September 2000	Retail version of Jasc Paint Shop Pro 7.0. Paint Shop Pro 7J is a localized version of Jasc Paint Shop Pro 7 for Japan market from P. & A. Inc., released on November 10, 2000. Polish version of Jasc Paint Shop Pro 7 was distributed by Connect Distribution.
7.01	2001 February	
7.02	2001 March	Brazil version of Jasc Paint Shop Pro 7.02 was distributed by XpressSoft.
7.04	22 August 2001 (Anniversary Edition)	The Jasc Paint Shop Pro 7 Anniversary Edition includes: Jasc Paint Shop Pro 7.04; Jasc Media Center Plus 3.1; Jasc Animation Shop 3.04; Special effects filters from Alien Skin Eye Candy, Virtual Painter, and Flaming Pear Essentials; A new Product Tour that explores common projects; Bonus hands-on tutorials from Paint Shop Pro experts; 30 new Picture Tubes, picture frames, and fun shapes; Chilean version of Jasc Paint Shop Pro 7 was distributed by Success S.A. Argentina (Spanish) version of Jasc Paint Shop Pro 7 was distributed by Softland.: France version of Jasc Paint Shop Pro 7 was distributed by AB Soft.
7.05	2002 June	Version number used by a Dell specific bundled version as part of Dell Picture Studio
8.00 public beta	17 February 2003	
8.00	28 April 2003	Changes to Jasc Paint Shop Pro 7 include: Automated Productivity Scripts macro scripting (based on Python); Dynamic Personalization user interface customizations (menus, toolbars, keyboard shortcuts and workspaces), task-specific work environments.; New precision Background Eraser tool; new Perspective Correction tool; new effects and filters; One Step Photo Fix, Learning Center. New brush engine.; Paint Shop Power Suite includes Jasc Paint Shop Photo Album 4, Jasc Paint Shop Xtras—Creative Edition 1, Jasc Paint Shop Xtras—Creative Edition 2, Jasc Animation Shop.
8.01	2003 June	
8.10	2003 October	The last version to support Windows 95
9.00	2004 August	Adds a history palette, natural media brushes, fill flash, backlight filter, limited raw image format support
9.01	2004 September	Final version to support Windows 98 and Windows ME

==== Corel Paint Shop Pro releases: 2005 ====
Version number	Release date	Release notes
X (10.00)	6 September 2005	Changes from JASC Shop Pro 9 include: New Paint Shop Pro X Learning Center: The new Learning Center organizes tools logically by task, providing users with a step-by-step guide and quick access to the instructions and tools needed to complete the most common photo editing projects.; The new Smart Photo Fix analyzes a photo and suggests settings to auto-correct color, brightness, sharpness, and saturation — all in one step.; Makeover tools: The makeover tools include the blemish fixer, toothbrush and suntan brush.; Object remover: The new object remover lets users seamlessly eliminate unwanted elements from photos, intelligently filling in the resulting gaps with appropriate background detail.; Special effects for black & white photos: The new special effects filters converts images to simulated black and white infrared or apply color filters while converting to black and white images.; Advanced features: New features in Paint Shop Pro X now include support for 16-bit/channel adjustments, ICC-based color management, the ability to import and export CMYK images using ICC profiles, along with enhanced monitor calibration that allows LCD screens to be correctly calibrated.; Camera Raw support: Supports over forty Camera Raw file formats
X (10.01)	?	Changes from Corel Paint Shop Pro X include: Date taken field can now be set to dates prior to 1970; Saving 24-bit files to EPS/IFF/PCT/XWD formats no longer gives an incorrect message that the bit depth needs to be changed to 24-bit.; Merging vector layers while the layer name is in rename mode no longer causes problems.; If you eject a CD while the Browser palette is generating thumbnails, Paint Shop Pro no longer becomes unstable.: Exif data is now fully supported in Camera Raw formats; The auto-rotate feature now works with Camera Raw files; New support for raw files from Nikon D50, Canon EOS Kiss Digital N, Olympus E-1/E-10/E-20 cameras; Improved RAW thumbnail quality for Canon Rebel XT/350D, Kodak DC760C, Pentax *istD cameras; TIFF/JPEG 2000 format fixes
X (10.02)	?	Changes from Corel Paint Shop Pro 10.01 include: New support for raw files from Canon Kiss n, Nikon D50/D70s, Konica-Minolta Maxxum7D/Dynax7D/Dynax5D cameras; Browser palette improvements; General improvements; File format improvements: Color management improvements: AdobeRGB profile has been added
X (10.03)	?	Changes from Corel Paint Shop Pro 10.02 include: Adds support for active memory system found in certain Lexar memory cards.; Fixed a problem introduced in 10.02 where RawShooter launches multiple copies of PSP.; Fixed an issue which caused plug-ins to not be loaded.; Updated customer support numbers in Help > Contact information.; Changed the Clarify command so strength better matches PSP9.; International version fixes: Europe: Fixed Kodak Gallery photo sharing site URLs.; Japanese: Fixed translations in image information (Exif tab) for date and time, original date and time, and digitized date and time.; Japanese: Fixed poor wording in Japanese Learning Center "Object Remover" topic.; Spanish: added missing items in the warnings list under general preferences.; Finnish: corrected terms for the pick, select, and dropper tools in the tools palette tool tips and the Learning Center.
X (10.10)	27 February 2006 (Photo Art Suite)	Paint Shop Pro Photo Art Suite includes Corel Paint Shop Pro X, Corel Painter Essentials 3, Corel Photo Album 6 - Deluxe Edition.

==== Corel Paint Shop Pro Photo releases: 2006–2008 ====
Version number	Release date	Release notes
XI (11.00)	12 September 2006	Fully rebranded as "Corel Paint Shop Pro Photo XI". Changes from Corel Paint Shop Pro X include: New Photo Organizer; New Color Changer Tool; New Time Machine: Time Machine lets users see what their photos would look like if they were taken in another era and processed using historical photo development processes from the 1830s to the 1980s.; Film and Filters: It lets users apply effects to an image to make it look as if it was taken with a variety of traditional film and filter types.; Skin Smoothing: Skin Smoothing feature lets users remove any wrinkles, blemishes or scars from the people in their photos.; New Quick Review: Quick Review allows users to apply a quick fix to a slide, set a rating for a slide, add captions and rotate images in a slide show.; New Photo Trays: Photo Trays allow users to sort their photos by letting them group photos in batches for their convenience.; New Video File Compatibility: Users can now make the most of video clips by viewing them and extracting freeze-frames from the clip.; Enhanced Curves and Levels: The Curves and Levels dialog boxes give users exceptional control over some of the most critical image adjustments such as contrast, color and levels.; Enhanced Corel Painter and Corel Painter Essentials Compatibility: Corel Painter and Corel Painter Essentials compatibility allows users to open and save images as RIFF files.; Enhanced Crop Tool: The Crop Tool provides users with the ability to get the exact dimensions they want in a snap.; Enhanced RAW Camera Support: Users can open and edit RAW files from leading digital cameras.; Enhanced Training Video: The product is shipped with a two-hour video training CD, Getting Starting With Corel Paint Shop Pro Photo XI, from Lynda.com; Inclusion of Corel Snapfire Plus SE photo and video sharing software.
XI (11.11)	December 2006	Bug fixes, including improvements in the appearance of Camera Raw images (and support for two new camera models) plus a performance increase of the organizer, new 'One-step photo fixes'.
XI (11.20)	February 2007	The last version to support Windows 2000
X2 (12.00)	5 September 2007	Changes from Corel Paint Shop Pro Photo XI include: Express Lab: The all-new Express Lab mode enables users to view and edit dozens of photos in the time it used to take to edit just a few.; Graphite Look and Feel: The new graphite workspace that puts the focus on the photo. The new interface also provides a neutral background for unbiased color adjustments.; HDR Photo Merge: The new Photo Merge feature allows users to create photos that capture the full details found in the shadows and the highlights of a high-contrast scene. Users can combine two or more photos taken at different exposures and use the Clarify feature to automatically "dodge and burn" bringing out the contrast.; Makeover Tools: New Thinify tool make anyone look thinner with just one click. New Eye Drop tool takes the red out of bloodshot eyes. Suntan brush and Blemish Fixer tools were enhanced.; Layer Styles: The new Layer Styles allow users to add drop shadows, embossing, outer and inner glows, bevels and reflections to text, photos and creative projects.; Visible Watermarks: Users can create and add a personal watermark to their photos.; Auto-Preserve Originals: The new Auto-Preserve Originals option enables users to freely experiment with changes to their photos, confident that their original image is preserved.; Save for Office: The new Save for Office option, allow photos to be automatically resized and saved in the appropriate format for a given project. File sizes are also automatically compressed to make it easier for the business user to share images via email. Users who prefer to Copy and Paste can use the new Copy Special options for the same benefits.; Dynamic Language Switching; Crop as New Image: The Crop as New Image option automatically opens scanned photos into separate documents.
X2 (12.01)	1 November 2007	Changes include: Added Raw camera formats for 9 manufacturers.
X2 (12.50)	9 September 2008 (Ultimate)	Paint Shop Pro Photo X2 Ultimate include: Enhanced Camera Raw Support: supports more than 250 raw camera formats; New Creative Content Pack: Creative Content Pack includes 150 brand-new, custom-made photo frames, photo edges and Picture Tubes with unique edges and custom graphics, including square or oval frames, modern or classic frames, mats or photo edges, or a variety of other styles.; New Background Remover: Background Remover isolates part of a background in an image and removes it, allowing the user to replace it with a complementary image.; Corel Painter Photo Essentials 4, PHOTORECOVERY for Digital Media, a 2GB Flash Drive.; New Certified for Windows Vista

==== Corel PaintShop Photo Pro releases: 2010-2011 ====
Version number	Release date	Release notes
X3 (13.00)	25 January 2010	Rebranded as "PaintShop Photo Pro X3". Changes from Corel Paint Shop Pro Photo X2 include: All-new Organizer: The new integrated Organizer includes tools for rating, tagging, locating and quickly touching up image files.; Multi photo Adjustments: Changes made to an image can be captured and easily applied to multiple photos; Smart Carver: Removing objects and scaling without distorting the image.; Express Lab: Adds Color Balance, Local Tone Mapping, Contrast/Brightness, Sharpen and One Step Noise Removal.; Camera RAW Lab: Supporting more than 350 RAW formats, the new RAW Lab makes it easy to adjust a variety of settings, such as white balance, exposure, brightness and saturation before processing. Adjustments made to any RAW image can be copied and applied to other RAW images in the Organizer.; Object Extractor: Object Extractor precisely mask fine image details that are otherwise difficult to preserve, such as fly away hair, wisps of smoke and tree branches.; Project Creator: This one stop tool makes it easy to create, edit and share projects. A project can include HD video. Photo projects can also be printed through Corel's online print service.; Inclusion of Corel Painter Photo Essentials 4.
X3 Service Pack 1 (13.10)	12 March 2010	Changes include: General stability - Application crashes when using commands in Full Editor & Express Lab.; EXIF data doesn't show in Full Editor and is missing from files saved.; Uncompressed TIFF files saved from RAW NEF source are incorrect and can't be opened.; Commands with on-screen preview aren't applied to the image after changing the preview state.
X3 Service Pack 2 (13.20)	29 June 2010	Changes include: Enhanced application stability and performance; Faster RAW decoding; Workflow enhancements to the user interface: repositioned rating controls in the Organizer; new zoom-level indicator and zoom control for previewing; HDR available in the Organizer; Tabbed Document set as the new default in the Full Editor; New RAW file support for Canon EOS 550D / Digital Rebel T2i / Kiss Digital X4, Canon EOS-1D Mark IV, Canon PowerShot S90, Casio EX-Z750, Casio EX-Z1050, Fuji FinePix S200EXR, Fuji FinePix HS10/HS11, Kodak Z981, Olympus E-P2, Panasonic DMC-G2, Panasonic DMC-GF1, Pentax K-x, Samsung WB550, Sony DSLR-A450, Sony DSLR-A500, Sony DSLR-A550, Sony NEX-3, Sony NEX-5 cameras
X3 Service Pack 3 (13.30)	17 November 2010	Changes include: improves the overall stability; improves compatibility with third party photo-editing plug-ins
X3 Service Pack 4 (13.40)	17 December 2010	Changes include: New RAW file support for Canon EOS 60D/PowerShot G12, Nikon D7000/D3100, Olympus E-5, Pentax K-r/K-5/645D, Panasonic DMC LX5/FZ40/FZ100, Samsung WB2000, Sony SLT-A33/SLT-A55 cameras; Improved Camera RAW handling for Fujifilm FinePix HS10/11, Panasonic DMC L1/LC1/LX1/LX2/LX3/FZ28/FZ30/FZ50/G1, Leica V-LUX1/D-LUX2/D-LUX3/D-LUX4/Digilux 2/Digilux 3, Samsung EX1/NX10 cameras; improves stability when working with duplicate layers
X3 Service Pack 5 (13.50)	5 September 2011	Changes include: New RAW file support for Canon EOS 1100D/600D/PowerShot S95, Fuji F550EXR/HS20EXR/X100, Kodak Z990, Leaf Aptus-II 12, Nikon D5100/Coolpix P7000, Olympus E-PL1s/E-PL2/XZ-1, Panasonic DMC-GF2/DMC-GH2, Sony A290/A390/A580 cameras; Enhanced RAW support for Canon PowerShot G12/EOS 600D/1100D, Nikon D7000, Olympus E-5, Pentax K-r/K-5, Samsung NX10/EX1/WB2000/NX1, Fujifilm FinePix S200EXR, Apple QuickTake 100/150 cameras; Ability to edit photo data (properties and personal information) outside the application; MOV video playback

==== Corel PaintShop Pro releases: 2011–present ====
Version number	Release date	Release notes
X4 (14.0)	7 September 2011	Rebranded as "PaintShop Pro X4". Changes from Corel PaintShop Photo Pro X3 include: Streamlined user-interface with workspaces; Photo Blend for combining the best parts of multiple photos of a single scene; optimized HDR workflow Optimized performance: Up to two times faster than X3; Ultimate version includes Nik Color Efex Pro 3.0 photographic filters, buyer's choice of 21 high-quality images from Fotolia and additional Picture Tubes.
X4 Service Pack 1 (14.1)	5 December 2011	Changes include: resizeable icon sizes; customizable workspace color; break compatibility with some custom workspace; New RAW file support for Olympus E-P3, Leica D-Lux 5/V-Lux 2, Panasonic DMC-G3/DMC-GF3, Sony NEX-C3/SLT-A35, Canon PowerShot SX30 IS cameras
X4 Service Pack 2 (14.2)	31 May 2012	Changes include: Canon PowerShot S100, FUJIFILM FinePix F600EXR/FUJIFILM X10, Leica V-LUX 3, Nikon CoolPix P7100/Nikon 1, Olympus E-PL3/E-PM1, Panasonic DMC-GX1/DMC-FZ150, Phase One H 25/P40, Samsung NX200, Sony NEX-3/NEX-5N/NEX-7/SLT-A65/SLT-A77; Improved Camera RAW support for selected cameras from Olympus, Panasonic, Phase One, Samsung, and Sony; Better PSD file support; Improved display results when switching workspace color; Scripts recording issues on 64-bit systems
X4 Service Pack 2 (14.3)	3 December 2012	Changes include: Facebook: Photos weren't always uploading to the selected album.; GIF: A number of issues related to GIF output have been fixed.; File Format Exclusions preference: Excluded file formats were displaying in the Organizer palette.; File Locations preference: Some path information wasn't accurate.
X5 (15.0)	5 September 2012, 5 June 2013 (Walmart)	Paintshop Pro X5 was derived from Ulead PhotoExplorer. Adds face recognition, instant effects palette, graduate filter effect, Retro Lab, single RAW photo, run multiple scripts, Corel guide, photo mapping, support for Adobe Photoshop brushes, RAW/JPG pair filtering, 16-bit supported in 57 additional adjustments and effects, enhanced tools (text, crop, HDR, photo blend), Share My Trip on-line slide show creation Ultimate bonus pack includes Reallusion FaceFilter Studio 2.0, NIK Color Efex Pro 3.0, Creative collection (with "over 100 unique brushes, textures and royalty-free backgrounds").
X5 Service Pack 1 (15.1)	6 August 2012	Changes include: New RAW file support for Canon EOS 5D Mark III/EOS-1D X/EOS 650D/PowerShot G1 X/PowerShot SX220, FUJIFILM F770EXR/HS30EXR (HS33EXR)/X-Pro1/X-S1, NIKON D3200/D4/D800, OLYMPUS E-M5, Panasonic DMC-GF5, Samsung NX20/NX210/NX1000, Sony NEX-F3/DSC-RX100/SLT-A37/SLT-A57 cameras; Autosave enabled in the Edit workspace; Improved sharing with Facebook; Better zooming and more consistent image display results; Improved stability
X5 Service Pack 2 (15.2)	31 January 2013	Changes include: New RAW file support for Canon 6D/EOS M/PowerShot G15/PowerShot S110/PowerShot SX50 HS, CASIO EX-ZR100, FUJIFILM X-E1/XF1, LEICA D-LUX6/V-LUX4, NIKON D600/COOLPIX P7700, OLYMPUS E-PL5, Panasonic DMC-FZ200/DMC-G5/DMC-LX7, PENTAX K-5 II, SAMSUNG EX2F, Sony DSC-RX1/NEX-6/SLT-A99 cameras; Enhanced camera support for Canon EOS-1D X, FUJIFILM F77/F8, Kodak DCS520C/DCS560C/DCS620C/DCS620X/DCS660C, NIKON D3200, OLYMPUS E-5/E-M5, Sony DSC-F828/DSC-RX100 cameras; Cataloging improvements; Share My Trip – Public folder guidance; Improved overall stability and fixes to a number of areas
X5 Service Pack 3 (15.3)	15 August 2013	Changes include: New RAW file support for Canon EOS 700D/EOS 100d/PowerShot A3300, FUJIFILM SL1000/HS50EXR/X100S/X20, NIKON D7100/COOLPIX A/COOLPIX P330/1 V2/1 J3, OLYMPUS E-PM2/XZ-10/XZ-2, Panasonic DMC-GF6/DMC-GH3/DMC-G6, SAMSUNG NX300, Sony NEX-5R/NEX-3N/SLT-A58 cameras; Enhanced camera support for Canon EOS 6D/PowerShot G15/PowerShot S110/PowerShot SX50HS, NIKON D600, OLYMPUS E-PL5, PENTAX K-5 II, Sony DSC-RX1, SLT-A57 cameras; Workspace fixes; Improved overall stability and fixes to a number of areas
X6 (16.0)	4 September 2013	New features include: 64-bit applications; new memory management work opening and saving files and applying effects is accelerated in both 32- and 64-bit versions of X6; Enhanced support for Photoshop plug-ins: supports many 64-bit Adobe Photoshop plug-ins in addition to Photoshop format (.psd) images and Photoshop format (.abr) brushes.; Smart Selection Brush: enables the selection of objects based on a brushstroke; Auto Selection tool: lets users enclose an image area in a bounding rectangle that automatically detects and snaps to the edge.; PaintShop Pro X6 Ultimate includes Athentech Imaging's Perfectly Clear and Reallusion's FaceFilter3 Standard.
X6 Service Pack 1 (16.1)	31 October 2013	New features include: Windows 8.1 full compatibility; New RAW support for Canon EOS-1D C, Nikon E700, SAMSUNG NX1100/NX 2000 cameras; Enhanced camera support for Canon EOS 100D camera; Enhanced support for high-resolution displays (User interface truncation for high-resolution monitors (up to 200 dpi)); Improved overall stability and fixes applied to a number of areas
X6 Service Pack 2 (16.2)	6 March 2014	New features include: New RAW support for Canon EOS 70D/EOS C500/PowerShot G16/S120, Fujifilm HS2/F900EXR/X-A1/X-E2/X-M1/XQ1, Nikon Df/D5300/D610/COOLPIX P7800/1 AW1, Leica C (Type 112), Olympus E-P5/E-PL6/E-M1/STYLUS 1, Pentax K-3, Panasonic DMC-FZ7/DMC-LF1/DMC-GM1/DMC-GX7, Samsung EK-GN120/GX20, Sony DSC-RX100M2/DSC-RX10/ILCE-7R/ILCE-7/ILCE-3000/NEX-5T cameras; Enhanced camera support for Panasonic DMC-G6 camera; Enhanced support for high-resolution displays (User interface truncation for high-resolution monitors (up to 200 dpi)); Improved overall stability and fixes applied to a number of areas
X7 (17.0)	27 August 2014	New features include: New Magic Fill; New Text and Shape Cutting tools; New Color Materials Palette; New Image dialog; New Quick Preview for Instant Effects; New Smart Edge; New XMP support; Enhanced Faster brushes; Enhanced Redesigned dialogs; Enhanced RAW support; Enhanced Layer workflow; Enhanced HDR photo merge
X7 Service Pack 1 (17.1)	7 January 2015	New features include: Improved overall stability and fixes applied to a number of areas; New ways to get more creative content without having to leave the program
X7 Service Pack 2 (17.2)	17 March 2015	New features include: RAW support for more than 20 new cameras, including many highly requested models; Improved overall stability and fixes applied in a number of areas
X7 Service Pack 3 (17.3)	28 May 2015	New features include: RAW support for more than 10 new cameras; Improved overall stability and fixes to a number of areas
X7 Service Pack 4 (17.4)	23 February 2017	New features include: New Welcome work-space; RAW support for 29 new cameras; FREE Corel ParticleShop plugin with 5 amazing brushes; Important: This update might affect work-space customization. If you customize your work-space, save before you install.
X8 (18.0)	11 September 2015	New features include: New Text wrapping; New Magic Move; Redesigned Batch Mode interface; New more precise selections; New Lens Correction; New 4K monitor support; New Layer enhancements; Enhanced Gradients; Enhanced Faster Saving; Enhanced Text and Shape Cutting tools; Enhanced Smart Edge
X8 Service Pack 1 (18.1)	21 December 2015	New features include: New Welcome guide and dynamic content trays; Improved brush performance; Improved overall stability and fixes applied to a number of areas
X8 Service Pack 2 (18.2)	21 April 2016	New features include: Option to set Materials palette to classic layout; RAW support for more than 25 new cameras; Lens profile updates; Fixes applied in a number of areas
X9 (19.0)	18 August 2016	New features include: New Project Templates; New Screenshot featuring Smart Capture; New Gradient Fill tool; Improved Stylus and Graphics Tablet Support; Improved Text tool; Enhanced Real-Time Photo Effects
2018 (20.0)	9 August 2017	New features include: Runs faster; Streamlined interface; Larger icons on toolbar; Over 125 new brushes, gradients, textures, and patterns
2019 (21.0)	August 28, 2018	New features include: Simplified Interface; PSP 2019 has a more streamlined interface than previous versions; Two new creative tools (The separate 360-degree edit window offers two functions: Straighten, and Remove Tripod Head); Performance and tool enhancements; Content galore; Corel has added to the many scores of brushes, color palettes, gradients, patterns and picture tubes in PSP 2019
2020 (22.0)	August 1, 2019	New features include: NEW: Touch-ready Photography Workspace; NEW SmartClone tool; NEW: Refine Brush feature; ENHANCED: Text editing, rendering, inputting and wrapping; NEW Creative photo effects (GRFX Studio); Create mesmerizing photo animations; NEW Photography Workspace; NEW Refine Brush; ENHANCED Text tool; ENHANCED Pic-to-Painting; NEW Copy and Paste Layer Styles; ENHANCED Depth of Field; ENHANCED Legacy features; NEW Creative content
2023 (25.0)	December 2022	New features include: NEW AfterShot Lab; ENHANCED Frame Tool; NEW Focus Stacking; ENHANCED Real-time Blend Mode preview; NEW Snap to Objects; ENHANCED Usability and Performance

== Picture tubes ==
Picture tubes are graphic images with no background. They are often used as a starting point for complex images; that is, they are combined with other image elements to produce a final work. Tubes can also be regarded as graphic brushes based on a pre-created image; this was their original use. Instead of leaving a trace of color on the canvas, they would leave a trail of images. Popular tube subjects include alphabets, humans (also known as dollz), animal and toy figures, flowers, love messages and seasonal symbols.

The tube system originated with PSP Pro version 5. Native tube files may be in .tub, .psp, .pspimage, and .psptube formats. XnView, IrfanView, and TubeEx are separate graphics programs that can convert tube files (.tub) to .png.

== Ultimate edition ==
PaintShop Pro Photo X2 Ultimate was released towards the end of life of PaintShop Pro Photo X2, in September 2008. It included 150 additional picture frames and Picture Tubes, the programs Background Remover, Corel Painter Photo Essentials 4, and Photorecovery, as well as RAW support for 250 cameras and a 2GB flash drive.

Subsequent Ultimate editions were released contemporaneously with the basic version. PaintShop Pro X4 Ultimate included Nik Color Efex Pro 3.0, a voucher for 21 images from Fotolia at high quality, and additional Picture Tubes. X5 Ultimate included Reallusion FaceFilter Studio 2.0, NIK Color Efex Pro 3.0, and "over 100 unique brushes, textures and royalty-free backgrounds". PaintShop Pro X6 Ultimate includes Athentech Imaging's Perfectly Clear and Reallusion's FaceFilter3 Standard. PaintShop Pro X7 Ultimate includes those same two items.

The bundled extras cannot be installed unless that version of the PaintShop program is already installed. However, once a bundled extra such as a plugin has been installed, the installed files can be copied to other versions, e.g., a plugin installed under X5 can be copied to X6 and even if X5 is then uninstalled, the plugin will continue to work under X6. Corel releases a new X version roughly annually, so this ability to copy means PSP users do not have to choose between updating or continued use of Ultimate add-ons from previous versions.

== Other related versions and products ==
- Paint Shop Pro Personal is a version of JASC Paint Shop Pro 9 for the Japanese market, published by Sourcenext Corporation.
- Paint Shop Photo Album is a simplified version of Paint Shop Pro designed to enhance, organize, and share digital photos. The Corel version was released as version 5.
- Corel Paint Shop Pro Album Personal is a version of Corel Paint Shop Pro Album 5 Deluxe for Japanese market, published by Sourcenext Corporation.
- Corel Photo Album is the successor of Jasc Paint Shop Photo Album. First release was version 6.
- Corel PaintShop Photo Express is the successor of Corel Photo Album. First release was PaintShop Photo Express 2010.
- Paint Shop Pro Photo Studio is a site launched as part of Corel Paint Shop Pro Photo X2 launch celebration.

== License management software ==
Versions X through to X8 install a third-party program named PSIService.exe, a Windows service called ProtexisLicensing. Written by Protexis, this runs in the background and collects licensing information. This program communicates with a remote host. Manually disabling the Protexis Licensing service may cause Corel Paint Shop Pro Photo to cease functioning.

== See also ==
- Comparison of raster graphics editors
