= PMView =

Graphics image viewer

- Original author: Peter Nielsen
- Developer: Peter Nielsen
- Release: 1992; 34 years ago
- Stable release: 3.82 / 24 February 2020; 6 years ago
- Written in: C++
- Operating system: Microsoft Windows, OS/2
- Size: 7 MB
- Available in: English, German, French, Swedish; the OS/2 version also Russian
- Type: Image viewer
- License: Proprietary
- Website: www.pmview.com

PMView is a raster graphics image viewer, converter, and organizer with basic image editing capabilities. It was originally developed for OS/2 but is also available for Microsoft Windows.

== What it is and what it does ==
PMView reads and writes and converts between more than 40 image file formats, shows the images on the screen, single and in slide shows, rotates or mirrors them, changes sizes and color depth, crops parts out of the images, and provides global editing of the image, all this individually on the image displayed on the screen, by prerecorded macros called batch scripts on a range of images, or directly in the File Open Container. And it can, of course, also print the images.

PMView uses its own file open dialog, showing thumbnails of all images in a given folder in what PMview calls the "File Open Container", unless the user chooses to see only the filenames. The size of those thumbnails can be changed by the user, and the user can choose if the thumbnails are taken from the operating system, out of the JPEG or PNG files, or dynamically generated by PMView. Still in the "File Open Container", all or selected images can be processed by file copy and move operations, conversion between file formats, application of various image editing tasks in batch operation macros.

PMView can acquire images by scanning of images using a TWAIN interface to an Image scanner, and by grabbing a part of the computer's screen by screenshots. And of course, from the clipboard, as a new image and as a new area of an existing image.

Image editing features are global color modifications regarding color balance, gamma correction, luminance, negative conversion, solarization, sharpening and softening of edges, and a number of filters including Gaussian blur and user-defined filters.

For images with indexed color (2, 4, 16, or 256 colors), typical for GIF images and found in most PNG images, PMView can edit the palette of colors, thus modifying the color of individual spots within the image.

The Windows version runs on all Windows versions from Windows 98 to Windows 8, including native 64 bit versions, the OS/2 version on OS/2 3 "Warp" and newer. The program is written in C++ with some routines in Assembler, making heavy use of multithreading, creating and destroying threads as needed, thus enabling PMView to be very fast.

== History ==
PMView is short for Presentation Manager Viewer. The name dates back to 1992 and OS/2 version 1.x where the graphical shell for OS/2 was called Presentation Manager. An early OS/2 version of PMView was on the IBM BBS as "pmview86.zip, 231751, 11-30-93, PM Picture viewer. GIF/BMP/JPG/PCX/TGA". PMView version 1.00 was released in 1997. PMView version 1 was available in English, German, French, and Spanish. The last OS/2-only version of PMView as version 1.05.

PMView 2000 (a.k.a. PMView v2.00) was released in early 2000 for both Windows and OS/2. The last version of PMView 2000 is v2.32.

PMView Pro (a.k.a. PMView v3.00) was released in 2003.

== Details ==
PMview supported file formats
Format	Extension	Read	Write	notes
OS/2 Bitmap	BMP	Yes	Yes	
Windows Bitmap	BMP	Yes	Yes	
Windows Cursor	CUR	Yes	Yes	
DCA/Intel DCX, or multipage PCX	DCX	Yes	Yes	Digital Communications Associates (DCA) and Intel had designed the DCA/Intel Communicating Applications Specification (CAS). It defines a standard, high-level programming interface for data communications applications. The DCX format is the standard file format for storing FAX images in CAS.
Encapsulated PostScript	EPS	No	Yes	
Flexible Image Transport System	FITS	Yes	Yes	image with a BITPIX value of 8, 16, 32, -32, or -64. The value of NAXIS must be two (2) or greater.
CCITT Group 3 Facsimile	G3	Yes	Yes	
Graphics Interchange Format	GIF	Yes	Yes	
OS/2 Icon	ICO	Yes	Yes	
Windows Icon	ICO	Yes	Yes	
Electronic Arts IFF	IFF	Yes	Yes	only FORM type IFF files that hold an image, subtypes ILBM: 1..n planes, PBM: 8 bits chunky format, special subtypes HAM: 3..16 planes, DHAM, SHAM, Palette change PCHG
Digital Research GEM	IMG	Yes	Yes	
JPEG File Interchange Format	JPG	Yes	Yes	
OS/2 Boot Logo	LGO	Yes	Yes	
MacPaint	MAC	Yes	Yes	
Microsoft Paint	MSP	Yes	Yes	
Kodak Photo-CD	PCD	Yes	No	
ZSoft Paintbrush / PC Paintbrush	PCX	Yes	Yes	
PCPaint/Pictor Paint	PIC	Yes	Yes	
Bio-Rad Image	PIC	Yes	No	only reads grayscale Bio-Rad PIC files that have eight bits per pixel
Autodesk Softimage Picture	PIC	Yes	Yes	
Netpbm Portable Bitmap	PBM	Yes	Yes	
Netpbm Portable Graymap	PGM	Yes	Yes	
Netpbm Portable Pixmap	PPM	Yes	Yes	
Netpbm Portable Anymap	PNM	Yes	Yes	
Portable Network Graphics	PNG	Yes	Yes	
Adobe Photoshop Document	PSD	Yes	Yes	
OS/2 Pointer	PTR	Yes	Yes	
Sun Raster	RAS	Yes	Yes	
Compuserve RLE	RLE	Yes	Yes	
Utah RLE	RLE	Yes	Yes	The Utah RLE format was developed around 1983 by Spencer Thomas at the University of Utah Department of Computer Science, as part of the Utah Raster Toolkit
Structured Fax File	SFF	Yes	Yes	
Seattle FilmWorks	SFW	Yes	No	
Silicon Graphics Image	SGI	Yes	Yes	
PMView Slideshow File	SHW	Yes	Yes	
Truevision Targa	TGA	Yes	Yes	
Tagged Image File Format	TIF	Yes	Yes	
WAP Bitmap Format	WBMP	Yes	Yes	
WordPerfect Graphics	WPG	Yes	Yes	
X BitMap	XBM	Yes	Yes	
X PixMap	XPM	Yes	Yes	
X Window Dump	XWD	Yes	Yes	
