= LVP =

LVP may refer to:

== Science, mathematics, and computing ==
- Laser voltage prober, a tool for analysing integrated circuits
- Left ventricular pressure, blood pressure in the heart
- Large volume parenterals, a type of injectable pharmaceutical product
- Lithium vanadium phosphate battery, a proposed type of lithium-ion battery
- Low-voltage programming, see In-system programming § Signals and pinout
- Low-voltage protection, a safety feature preventing machinery from automatically restarting when power is restored following a power outage, as opposed to low-voltage release
- LView Pro, a bitmap graphics editor for Microsoft Windows

== Political parties ==
- Liberal Vannin Party, a political party on the Isle of Man founded in 2006
- Lithuanian Peasants Party (1990–2001), a former party
- Latvian Unity Party (1992–2001), a former party

== Other ==
- LView, image editing software
- Lakshmi Vilas Palace, Vadodara, Gujarat, India, a palace
- An abbreviation for works by Dutch composer Leopold van der Pals
- An abbreviation for actress and television personality Lisa Vanderpump
- Limited Validity Passport, a type of Australian passport
- Learner Variability Project, an education research translation initiative of Digital Promise that focuses on whole learner education practices
- Luxury vinyl plank, flooring material with a wood-like appearance
- Liverpool, a city in Merseyside, England
