= Jieh-Tsorng Wu =

Taiwanese engineer

Jieh-Tsorng Wu is an engineer at the National Chiao-Tung University in Hsinchu City, Taiwan. He was named a Fellow of the Institute of Electrical and Electronics Engineers (IEEE) in 2016 for his contributions to the design and calibration of high-performance data converters.
