= PCPaint =

Mouse-driven GUI paint program, 1984–1989

- A demonstration of PCPaint
- Original authors: John Bridges; Doug Wolfgram
- Developer: Microtex Industries for Mouse Systems
- Release: 1984; 42 years ago
- Stable release: PCPaint 3.1 / 1989; 37 years ago
- Operating system: DOS
- Type: Graphics software

PCPaint was one of the first IBM PC-based mouse-driven GUI paint programs, released in 1984. It followed after Microsoft Doodle, released in 1983 with the Microsoft Mouse version 1 drivers for DOS, and around the same time as Digital Research's Draw program. It was developed and created by John Bridges and Doug Wolfgram. It was later developed into Pictor Paint.

The hardware manufacturer Mouse Systems bundled PCPaint with millions of computer mice that they sold, making PCPaint one of the best-selling DOS-based paint programs of the mid 1980s.

== History ==
In 1983, Doug Wolfgram bought a Microsoft Mouse and decided to write a drawing program for it. He named it "Mouse Draw". The interface was primitive but the program functioned well. Wolfgram traveled to SoftCon in New Orleans where he demonstrated the program to Mouse Systems. Mouse Systems was developing an optical mouse and they wanted to bundle a painting program so they agreed to publish Mouse Draw. The original program was written entirely in assembly language with primitive graphics routines developed by Wolfgram.

John Bridges worked for an educational software company, Classroom Consortia Media, Inc., developing and writing Apple and IBM graphics libraries for CCM's software. Bridges and Wolfgram were friends who had been connected through a bulletin board system developed and run by Wolfgram. The two collaborated cross country via the BBS, Wolfram in California and Bridges in New York.

Mouse Systems wanted the paint program to capture the look and feel of MacPaint. John Bridges and Doug Wolfgram started reworking Mouse Draw into what became PCPaint. The program was completely re-written using Bridge's graphics library and the top-level elements were written in C rather than assembly language. Bridges developed the core graphics code for the first version of PCPaint while Wolfgram worked on the user interface and top-level code. Mouse Systems signed an exclusive agreement with Wolfgram's company, Microtex Industries, Inc., to bundle PCPaint with every mouse they sold. They began publishing PCPaint with their mice in 1984.

Microsoft responded in 1985 by bundling a competing product, PC Paintbrush, with version 4 of its DOS drivers for the Microsoft Mouse, replacing its in-house Microsoft Doodle program which it published with version 1 of the DOS drivers in mid-1983. Microsoft's mouse began to outsell Mouse Systems mouse. In November 1985 Microsoft bundled a cut-down version of PC Paintbrush with Windows 1.0 (called Microsoft Paint), later bundling an updated version of PC Paintbrush with Windows 3.0 (as Paintbrush), impacting PCPaint's marketshare.

In early 1987, Mouse Systems decided that PCPaint wasn't helping to sell mice any longer so they discontinued the bundle deal and returned rights to the code to MicroTex Industries, but retained rights to the name, PCPaint. Wolfgram then combined the paint program with a new animation system he was developing (called GRASP) and Paul Mace Software bought publishing rights to the animation system and PCPaint, which was to be renamed Pictor. Bridges again got involved and took over programming responsibilities for GRASP as well as PCPaint while Wolfgram focused on more of the business details.

In creating the first version of PCPaint, Doug had a dual-floppy machine with a Computer Innovations compiler on one disk and source code on the other. John had the "luxury" of a 10MB hard disk in his XT. Data was exchanged daily via 1200, then 2400 baud modems.

=== Authorship and Ownership ===
John Bridges and Wolfgram continued to work on PCPaint and GRASP on behalf of Paul Mace Software until 1990. Also in that year, Doug Wolfgram sold his remaining rights to PCPaint (and its animation system, GRASP) to John Bridges.

In 1994, GRASP development stopped and so did development of Pictor Paint. John Bridges terminated his GRASP publishing contract with Paul Mace Software, and went off to create GLPro (the next generation of GRASP) with GMEDIA. Along with GLPro, came GLPaint, the successor to PCPaint and Pictor Paint.

== Versions ==
- In June 1984, Mouse Systems shipped PCPaint 1.0, the first GUI based Paint program for the IBM PC family of computers. John Bridges and Doug Wolfgram, were the co-authors of PCPaint 1.0. PCPaint 1.0 saved its graphics in a modified BSaved image format with the extension of ".PIC".
- The release of PCPaint Version 1.5 followed in late 1984, with the additions of graphics image compression for the .PIC format and support for "larger-than-screen" images. PCjr support was also added in this version after overcoming severe memory shortage problems getting PCPaint to run on the 128k PCjr.
- October 1985 saw the release of PCPaint 2.0. EGA support and publishing features were added to this version. The .PIC format was further refined, offering support for the rapidly expanding graphics capabilities of the PC and efficient image compression.
- PCPaint 3.1 was released in 1989. Unlike previous versions, it was not bundled with mice but was sold as a stand-alone software product. PCPaint 3.1 offered improved text and image handling, provided 36 types of flood and fill, worked with VGA adapters in hi-res 16-color and 256-color modes, allowed the user to save and retrieve files in a variety of intercompatible formats (.PIC, .GIF, .PCX, .IMG), and printed selected portions of images on color or black-and-white dot matrix, ink jet, and laser printers such as PostScript and HP Laser Jet. PCPaint 3.1 is still in use today by some users of DOS emulation programs like DOSBox and available for free download.
- Pictor Paint was an improved version, written by John Bridges, and bundled with GRASP GRaphical System for Presentation also written by John Bridges. It was also called "The Painter's Easel".
- GLPaint, released in 1995, was the last in this series of paint programs written by John Bridges. By 1998 version 7.0 provided support for TrueColor images and the Pictor PIC format was expanded to handle these.

== Pictor PIC Image Format ==
PCPaint 1.0 saved its graphics in a modified BSAVE image format (which was popular at the time) with the file type (extension) of ".PIC". By PCPaint 1.5 this format was extended further to accommodate image compression. With the release of version 2.0 the PICtor PIC image format was developed almost to its present state, with no similarity to the BSAVE format used by earlier versions.

Pictor Paint saved its files in a compressed format with the file extension PIC, which was the same format used by PCPaint.

== See also ==
- GLPro

== Bibliography ==
- Encyclopedia of Graphics File Formats, 2nd Edition by Murray, James D., Van Ryper, William, ISBN 1-56592-161-5
- The Graphics File Formats Page, GL - Another animation format, Dr. Martin Reddy, Technical Lead, R & D, Pixar Animation Studios
- The History of GLPRO, by G-media/IMS, GLPro Mailing List Archive
