= VGACAD =

- Developer: Lawrence Gozum
- Stable release: 2.5
- Operating system: MS-DOS
- Type: CAD
- License: Proprietary

VGACAD was the parent of a suite of shareware graphic utilities made for the MS-DOS operating system used in the IBM PC and clones. It was popular for editing and capturing images using BSAVE (graphics image format) and provided an early graphic editing suite compatible with multiple graphic cards and resolutions, used on the IBM PC.

== Usage ==
Written by Lawrence Gozum in 1987, it was the genesis of multiple versions and improvements over 10 years. Ran with his brother, Marvin initially helped with design ideas, strategic focus, technical support calls, and managing the early shareware business. The growth of the VGACAD suite grew quickly to preoccupy most of their time. Lawrence then focused more of his efforts on software and formed Applied Insights, to manage VGACAD and its offspring, VidFun, and Ai Picture Explorer. At its peak, its users ranged from individuals, Federal government offices, museums and major newspapers.

== Features ==
VGACAD was a misnomer, and meant VGA-Computer Assisted Drawing, rather than computer-aided design, as CAD is commonly referred to today. Its longevity was due to its color accuracy, speed, small size, and that its suite of small utilities often worked stand-alone. One called VGACAP, for 'capture', dumped video memory into a file that could later be converted to popular graphic image formats, later made commonplace when Microsoft Windows programmed the print screen key to dump graphics into the clipboard. However, VGACAP ran insulated apart from early versions of Windows, and thus could capture screens were applications prohibited such function.
