= John Bridges (software developer) =

American computer programmer

John Bridges is the co-author of the computer program PCPaint and primary developer of the program GRASP for Microtex Industries with Doug Wolfgram. He is also the sole author of GLPro and AfterGRASP. His article entitled "Differential Image Compression" was published in the February 1991 issue of Dr. Dobb's Journal.

== Early work ==
In 1980 Bridges started his programming career at the NYU Institute for Reconstructive Plastic Surgery as a summer intern, working with sophisticated programmable vector graphics systems. He wrote editing tools and also updated and debugged software used for early 3D x-ray scanning research.

From 1981 to 1985 Bridges wrote the RAM disk drivers, utilities, cracking software, task switching software, and memory test diagnostics for Abacus, a maker of large memory cards for the Apple II.

In 1982, he started working for Classroom Consortia Media, Inc., an educational software company, developing and writing Apple and IBM graphics libraries and tools for their software. During his tenure there he created a drawing program called SuperDraw for CCM, and on his own wrote the core graphics code for what would later become PCPaint, as well as develop the GRASP GL library format.

== PCPaint ==
In 1984, Bridges developed the first version of PCPaint with Doug Wolfgram for Mouse Systems. PCPaint was the first IBM PC-based mouse driven GUI paint program. The company purchased the exclusive rights to PCPaint, and John continued development until 1990.

== GRASP ==
In 1985, Bridges' PCPaint code and Doug's slideshow program morphed into a new program, GRASP. GRASP was the first multimedia animation program for the IBM PC and created the GRASP GL library format. GRASP was originally released as shareware through Doug's company, Microtex Industries. However, version 2.0 and after were sold commercially by Paul Mace Software. Doug sold his shares of both PCPaint and GRASP to Bridges in 1990, and Bridges' work on GRASP continued through 1994, when he terminated the contract with Paul Mace Software. Bridges' work on GRASP included several toolsets and add-ons, such as Pictor Paint, ARTools, HRFE (High Res Flic Enhancement), and PC Speaker sound code that caused Paul Mace Software to be threatened with a lawsuit by RealSound because of the use of frequency modulation, upon which RealSound held a patent.

A stripped-down version of GRASP 4.0 was also included with copies of Philip Shaddock's Multimedia Creations: Hands-On Workshop for Exploring Animation and Sound.

== VIDSPEED ==
In 1987, Bridges released VIDSPEED, a freeware program that tests the speed of graphics cards by "[measuring] the throughput of writing constant pixel data to video memory over the bus in graphics modes." VIDSPEED was well received in the community and was recommended in at least two books, Patrick Killelea's Web Performance Tuning and Stephen J. Bigelow's Bigelow's Computer Repair Toolkit, though Bigelow expresses concern over support and updates.

== IBM Project ==
In 1986-87 Bridges authored a project for the IBM Multimedia Lab which played back full color video in a 1/4 size window on the new IBM Model 30 (8 MHz 8086 CPU) which had the new MCGA 320x200 256-color video mode. Not only did it play full color video at such an early date in DOS history, but it did so smoothly on one of the slowest, most low-end IBM PS/2 models sold. IBM applied for a patent on algorithms he developed, though it was filed under the name of the project manager at IBM.

Those same algorithms were later published in an article by Bridges entitled "Differential Image Compression", which first appeared in Dr. Dobb's Journal in February 1991. It was later reprinted in that same magazine in July 2001 along with James H. Sylvester's 1993 article "Differential Compression Algorithms", which adapts Bridges' algorithms to generalized data, not just graphics.

== IMAGETOOLS ==
Out of the IBM Project came IMAGETOOLS in 1987, a collection of high color (15bit, 24bit, 32bit) VGA/EGA image conversion and scaling tools. It was sold by MetaCreations Corp./Harvard Systems Corp (HSC Software).

== PICEM ==
In 1988, Bridges authored a freeware image viewer program called PICEM. Other image viewers at the time were commercial. PICEM also allowed the user to adjust images' brightness and contrast and to save the image being viewed to other formats including the BSAVE (graphics image format). PICEM became popular enough that Microsoft offered tech help in using it in conjunction with QuickBasic.

== VGAKIT ==
Also in 1988, Bridges released VGAKIT, the VGAKIT SVGA Programming Kit, as freeware. VGAKIT is an open source library for accessing extended graphics modes from DOS, which was not standardized before VESA VBE arrived. It was used in several open and closed source projects. The developer of UniVBE, a program that extended video cards' BIOS to become compatible with the new VESA VBE, said that Bridges "provided the information without which [UniVBE] would never have gotten started. The whole PC graphics community is deeply in his debt."

Author Michael Abrash, in his 1997 book Graphics Programming Black Book, says "Little other than my DDJ (Dr. Dobb's Journal) columns has been published about (Mode X), although Bridges has widely distributed his code for a number of undocumented 256-color resolutions, and I’d like to acknowledge the influence of his code on the mode set routine presented in [Chapter 47]." The codes to which Abrash refers are Mode X 360x480 256-color mode codes Bridges included with VGAKIT, and worked on any VGA, not just SVGAs. Abrash's DDJ articles were published circa 1991 before being compiled into GPBB.

== Pictor Paint and ARTOOLS ==
When GRASP 3.5 was released, it included Bridges' newest version of PCPaint, Pictor Paint. Version 4.0 included Bridges' ARTOOLS, which was a collection of image manipulation tools which included an early morphing utility that tracked all points in source and destination images, creating all the in-between frames.

== GLPro ==
In 1995, Bridges created GLPro for IMS as the newest incarnation of Bridges' ideas behind GRASP updated for Windows. In 2000 GLPro became property of GMedia PLC, which closed in 2001. Bridges stopped all GLPro work at that time.

A stripped-down version of GLPro was included with Conrad R. Brandt's book GLPRO Foundations 2000.

== AfterGRASP ==
In 2002, Bridges started work on a new program, AfterGRASP, designed to be backwards compatible with GLPro. Work is still continuing on that project.

== Pictor PIC image format ==
The PICtor PIC image format is an image file format developed by Bridges for PCPaint. It was also the native file format for GRASP, and GLPro and was the first widely accepted DOS imaging standard.

== See also ==
- PCPaint
- PICtor PIC image format
- GRASP
- GRASP GL library format
- GLPro

== External Pages ==
- AfterGRASP Homepage
- GLPro History
- GLPro Mailing List Archive
- GLPro History
