= Pocket Paint =

Microsoft Pocket Paint
- Pocket Paint on Windows CE
- Developer: Microsoft
- Operating system: Windows CE
- License: Freeware

Pocket Paint is the Windows CE version of the raster graphics editor Microsoft Paint accessory commonly included with the Windows operating system. Because it is written to run on the leaner Windows CE operating system, it lacks a few of the features found in its bigger brother for the desktop. The only image format supported is BMP.

Pocket Paint was bundled as part of Microsoft's Handheld PC and Palm-size PC Power Toys for Windows CE. Like the desktop Power Toys, the applications included in this freeware distribution were not officially supported by Microsoft, although most if not all were written by the operating system developers.

Pocket Paint has not been included with any of Microsoft's next-generation Power Toys for the CE operating system, such as the Pocket PC platform, and appears to be abandoned.

== See also ==
- Comparison of raster graphics editors
- Microsoft Fresh Paint
