= Dr. Halo =

Raster graphics editor

- Box art of version 1.23 showing main screen
- Developer: Media Cybernetics
- Release: July 1984; 41 years ago
- Platform: IBM PCs and compatibles
- Type: Raster graphics editor
- License: Proprietary software

Dr. Halo is a raster graphics editor developed by Media Cybernetics and released for computers running MS-DOS. It was among the first graphics editors available for MS-DOS with its initial release in 1984. Media Cybernetics boasted about three million users of Dr. Halo between 1984 and 1993.

== Features ==
Contemporary computer journalists compared the initial release of Dr. Halo's interface to that of MacPaint while calling it more feature-packed than either MacPaint or the competing MS-DOS graphic editor PC Paintbrush. Like MacPaint, Dr. Halo allows users to select different drawing tools by way of a toolbox on the left side of the screen. Underneath that toolbox at the bottom left corner are the primary options for the selected tool. A palette showing the available patterns and colors are shown at the bottom of the screen when Dr. Halo is first started. Unlike MacPaint, Dr. Halo eschews drop-down menus for a given tool's secondary options, in favor of an overlapping menu prompted by a right click over said tool. For example, right-clicking the type icon on the left-side toolbox allow users to select the type's face, size and direction. Also, unlike PC Paintbrush, when the initial release of Dr. Halo is first started it displays the last saved drawing along with its associated color and pattern palettes. The first release of Dr. Halo came packaged with a utility for making slide shows from Dr. Halo drawing files, as well as another utility for converting drawing files from other programs—such as Lotus-generated charts—for use with Dr. Halo or the slide show utility.

In addition to extending support to then-new peripherals and devices such as graphics cards, printers, and pointing devices, Dr. Halo II introduced a "virtual page" function which allowed users to take ASCII-encoded text files and import them into Dr. Halo, with options to lay out the text and set the text's type. Dr. Halo II also added undoing, graphics scaling, and a "smart eraser" tool that allows users to selectively replace a certain color used in a drawing. Alongside Dr. Halo II, Media Cybernetics developed the Dr. Halo Desktop Publishing Editor, or Dr. Halo DPE. The company touted Dr. Halo DPE as a desktop publishing package. In reality, it, like Dr. Halo II, was a raster editor that shared the former's ability to import text files while holding more sophisticated editing tools, as observed by InfoWorld, and making use of extended memory.

Dr. Halo III added the ability to correct for differences in the aspect ratio between the screen and the printer as well as improved dither algorithms. This release of Dr. Halo also added more features to the palette editor, and further included Multiboard Grab, a terminate-and-stay-resident screenshot utility. Dr. Halo IV spread the program over six modules: the graphics editor itself, a file viewer, the presentation program, the screenshot utility, a font editor and the image file conversion utility. Media Cybernetics sold the lattermost as the Halo Desktop Imager; it could convert graphics files created from scanner imaging software and other raster editors of the day into common file formats such as TIFF, GIF, Windows BMP and Dr. Halo's own HALO CUT format. They also introduced the Halo Image File Format Library—a software library enabling applications to read and write bitmap files in file formats such as the aforementioned—and Halo FX, a rebranded version of Media Cybernetics' Publisher's Partner, a true desktop publishing program.

Media Cybernetics discontinued Dr. Halo after version 4.0 but used its source code to develop the Halo Imaging Library, a Windows software library comprising 100 imaging functions for C development.

When bundled with KYE Systems equipment, Dr Halo was branded as "Dr Genius".

== Reception ==
Curt Suplee of The Washington Post praised version 3.0, writing "Even if you've never drawn so much as a glass of water, [Dr. Halo III] can put you in the picture. If you're an experienced user, more power to you." InfoWorld writer Ken Milburn called the same version a "[g]ood midrange package" with its user interface "the best we encountered" in the magazine's survey of DOS-based graphics editors released at the time. Galen Gruman of the same publication were more tempered with their praise, writing that Dr. Halo III had "powerful" graphics creation and editing abilities but was "difficult to learn because of its unintuitive interface. It only uses icons, which makes some features, such as quitting, nearly impossible to find." Brooks Hunt of Home Office Computing gave it four out of four stars.

Byte wrote that by version 4.0, "the program is showing its age; it isn't as well integrated as many comparable programs. Singly, the utilities are quite powerful, but the package lacks a unified menu structure".

== Version history ==
Version	Release date	Notes
1.0	July 1984	Initial release
2.0	August 1985	Marketed as Dr. Halo II
3.0	Late 1987	Marketed as Dr. Halo III
4.0	November 1991	Marketed as Dr. Halo IV, last release
