= Graphics Animation System for Professionals =

Multimedia animation software

GRASP
- GRaphic Animation System for Professionals
- Developer: John Bridges
- Operating system: MS-DOS
- Type: Graphics software

GRaphic Animation System for Professionals (GRASP) was the first multimedia animation program for IBM PC compatibles. It was also at one time the most widely used animation format.

Originally conceived by Doug Wolfgram under the name FlashGun, the first public version of GRASP was the Graphical System for Presentation. The original software was written by Doug Wolfgram and Rob Neville. It later became the GRaphic Animation System for Professionals. Many regard this as the birth of the multimedia industry.

== GRASP - Graphic Animation System for Professionals ==
=== GRASP 1.0 ===
In 1984 Doug Wolfgram conceived of the idea of an animation scripting language that would allow graphics images to move smoothly across a computer screen under program control. Persyst Systems hired Wolfgram's company to develop some graphics and animation for their new graphics card, the BoB board. The marketing manager from Persyst then moved to AST computer where he brought in Wolfgram to do similar animation work for the AST line of peripheral cards for PCs. 1

Wolfgram saw the growing demand for multimedia so he brought in John Bridges, with whom he had co-developed PCPaint for Mouse Systems in 1984. Together they co-developed the early versions of GRASP for Wolfgram's company, Microtex Industries. Subsequent versions followed. Version 1.10c was released in September 1986.

Starting with John and Doug's source code for PCPaint, the painting aspects were chopped out and instead a simple font editor for Doug's slideshow program FlashGun was created. The graphics library was used to make a simple script playback that had a command for each graphics library function. It also originally used the assembly language fades from FlashGun for a "FADE" command, but those image fade routines were mode specific (CGA) and difficult to enhance. The routines were rewritten along with the script parts. It stored all the files in a ZIB archive, renaming John Bridges' program ZIB to GLIB and the archives it produced were GL files.

=== GRASP 2.0 ===
In 1987, GRASP 2.0, was released and no longer distributed as ShareWare. It became a commercial product published in the US by Paul Mace Software. John Bridges assumed responsibility for development of the core engine while Wolfgram developed fades, external utilities and new commands.

=== GRASP 3.0 and 3.5 ===
In 1988, GRASP 3.0 was released, followed in October 1988 by GRASP 3.5, bundled with Pictor Paint, an improved PCPaint minus publishing features. GRASP 3.5 "[supported] a wide range of video formats, including CGA, EGA, Hercules, VGA and all popular enhanced VGA modes up to 800 x 600 pixels and 1,024 x 768 pixels resolution. The software [displayed] and [edited] images in several standard formats, including PC Paintbrush (PCX) and GIF."

Award-winning animator Tom Guthery claims that by using GRASP in 1990 his early animated computer programs "[gave] smooth movement and detailed animation to a degree that many programmers had thought impossible at the time".

=== GRASP 4.0 ===
In February 1991 GRASP 4.0 was released, with the ability to create "self-executing" demos (bind to make EXE added), AutoDesk FLI/FLC support, PC Speaker Digitized Sound, and a robust programming environment. It also included ARTOOLS, a collection of image manipulation tools which included an early morphing utility which tracked all points in source and destination images, creating all the in-between frames. Later that year HRFE (High Res Flic Enhancement) was offered as an add-on for GRASP, "[enabling] GRASP to recognize, import, manipulate and compile animations created in Autodesk Animator Pro environment."

In a published paper critiquing GRASP 4.0, the authors Stuart White and John Lenarcic said that "The GRASP language offers creative freedom in the development of interactive multimedia presentations, especially to seasoned programmers with an artistic inclination."

A stripped-down version of GRASP 4.0 was also included with copies of Philip Shaddock's Multimedia Creations: Hands-On Workshop for Exploring Animation and Sound.

=== Multi-Media GRASP 1.0 ===
In June 1993, Multi-Media GRASP 1.0 (also known as MMGRASP and MultiMedia GRaphic Animation System for Professionals Version 5.0) was released with TrueColor support.

Authorship and ownership

Early in 1990 Doug Wolfgram sold his remaining rights to GRASP (and PCPaint) to John Bridges.

In 1994, GRASP development stopped when John Bridges terminated his publishing contract with Paul Mace Software. In 1995, John created GLPro for IMS Communications Ltd, the newest incarnation of John's ideas behind GRASP updated for Windows. In 2002, John Bridges created AfterGRASP, a successor to GRASP and GLPro.

== GLPro ==
GLPro was a multimedia authoring application for MS-DOS and Microsoft Windows. GLPro is a contraction of Graphics Language Professional, and was written by John Bridges as a successor to GRASP. Windows support in GLPro was released in the summer of 1996.

Unlike competing technologies such as Macromedia Director, GLPro took a very minimalist approach, providing an extensive scripting language rather than a lot of WYSIWYG tools within a Graphical User Interface. Everything was accomplished by writing code using its BASIC-like syntax. The scripting language was not object oriented, and as a result consists of a very large number of specialised commands. The programmer was not able to create new classes or extend the language. It has been criticised for its syntactical inconsistency, steep learning curve, and the fact that it does not deliver a cross-platform multimedia solution. Despite this it has been enthusiastically received by numbers of users, many dating back to the early GRASP under MS-DOS days.

An unusual design philosophy behind GLPro is that it does not rely on external OS services to handle many media types, such as MP3 audio, MPEG video, etc. Instead it contains its own player code. The thinking is that by avoiding OS services for these tasks, the end user is spared the problem of needing to install additional components before being able to run a multimedia title on their machine - it is intended to "just work". Although an advantage for some standalone projects, this philosophy suffered from an inability to keep up with new media developments.

GLPro was moved into a separate company, GMedia, in early 2000, which closed their doors in February 2001 just as the native Macintosh and Linux support was entering public beta testing. Bridges is no longer involved in its development, and as of February 2002 is developing a new multimedia authoring system called AfterGRASP designed to be backwards compatible with GLPro with less emphasis on built-in media playback support.

GLPro is currently owned by Comlet Technologies, LLC. and is one of the primary languages used in its Comlets Message System product.

== See also ==
- GLPro
- Mouse Systems

== Bibliography for GLPro ==
- GLPro Mailing List Archive
- GLPro History
- The Graphics File Formats Page

GL - Another animation format
Dr. Martin Reddy
Technical Lead, R & D, Pixar Animation Studios
http://www.martinreddy.net/gfx/2d/GL.txt
