= Data converter =

A data converter may refer to

- a digital-to-analog converter;
- an analog-to-digital converter;
- any other device used in data conversion.
