= Spinner (computing) =

Graphical widget in interface design

Example of a spinner together with a text box, placed above a check box

A spinner or numeric updown is a graphical control element with which a user may adjust a value in an adjoining text box by either clicking on an up or down arrow, by pressing an arrow key down or moving mouse wheel, causing the value in the text box to increase (if the up arrow is held down) or decrease (if the down arrow is held down). A spinner is typically oriented vertically. In most cases holding a button down causes the speed at which the associated value changes to increase. Usually, the value of the spinner is displayed in a text box next to the spinner, allowing the user to use the spinner to adjust the value, or to type the value into the text box. The combination of spinner and text box was coined as a Value Box.

A spinner is different from a scrollbar or slider in that a spinner is typically used to adjust a value without changing the format of the display or the other information on the screen. Thus, the appearance of the spinner at a given time does not represent the quantity of the associated value.
