= Jasc Software =

American software developer

- Company type: Incorporation
- Industry: Software
- Founded: 1991
- Defunct: October 14, 2004
- Fate: Acquired by Corel
- Headquarters: Eden Prairie, Minnesota
- Key people: Robert Voit (founder)
- Products: Paint Shop Pro, Animation Shop, Image Robot, Media Center Plus, Webdraw, After Shot

Jasc Software, Inc. was an Eden Prairie, Minnesota-based company founded by Robert Voit, the creator of Paint Shop Pro, a popular graphics editing program. Jasc Software also created other popular software titles, including:

- Image Robot
- Animation Shop
- Media Center Plus
- Webdraw
- After Shot (later released as Photo Album)

On October 14, 2004, Corel Corporation announced the acquisition of Jasc Software, Inc. at announcement day, with the acquisition expected to be closed by the end of October 2004. Under the acquisition, Corel would maintain the former Jasc facility in Minneapolis, Minnesota for the Paint Shop family operations. Amish Mehta would continue to serve as the Chief Executive Officer of Corel Corporation, and several members of the Jasc senior management team would join Corel. At the time of deal closure, Jasc Software, Inc. had 120 employees, with revenues of more than $30 million.

On November 28, 2007, Corel announced the closure of the Minneapolis office. This effectively put an end to the former Jasc Software establishment. While a few positions remained in the Minneapolis area, most operations were transferred to Corel's other offices.

"Jasc" is derived from the acronym J.A.S.C. (Just Another Software Company). Founder Robert Voit needed a name to protect his assets legally, but at the time had not decided to make a go of the company so he came up with a tongue-in-cheek name. Later when the company took off, he realized that was not the best connotation for a company to have so he publicly "changed" the acronym to "Jets and Software Company" because he was a commercial airline pilot prior to starting the software company.

== Robert Voit ==
Robert Voit (from St. Cloud, Minnesota) was the founder of Jasc Software. He has a computer science degree minoring in aviation, completed in 1983. He was initially employed as a DC-9 pilot and then later founded the Jasc software company, which in 1991 produced Paint Shop Pro.
