= Scroll wheel =

Component of a computer mouse used for scrolling

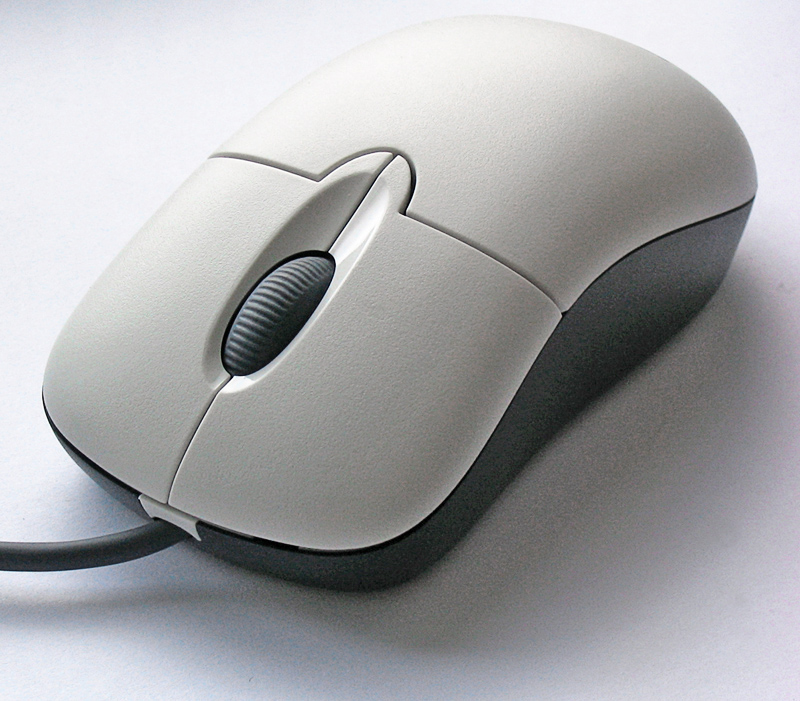
A mouse with a scroll wheel between its two buttons

A scroll wheel is a wheel used for scrolling on an electronic visual display. The term usually refers to a wheel found on a computer mouse, in which case it is also called a mouse wheel. It is often made of hard plastic with a rubbery surface, centred around an internal rotary encoder. It is usually located between the left and right mouse buttons and is positioned perpendicular to the mouse surface. Sometimes the wheel can be pressed to provide additional input, in effect functioning as an additional mouse button.

== Functionality ==
The scroll wheel is placed horizontally between the mouse buttons and commonly uses vertical scrolling, wherein rolling the wheel from the bottom side to the top is known as scrolling "upward" or "forward", while the reverse, i.e. rolling the wheel from the top side to the bottom, is known as scrolling "downward" or "backward".

In a graphical user interface, the "upward" motion moves contents of the window downward (and the scrollbar thumb, if present, upward), and vice versa. In other configurations (sometimes called "natural scrolling") the effect is inverted.

On most mice, the scroll wheel can often also be used as a third, middle mouse button by pressing down on it, known as the scroll button.

Some mice's scroll wheels can scroll horizontally by tilting them to the left or right, or there may be additional wheel on a perpendicular axis located elsewhere on the mouse.

The wheel is often, but not always, engineered with detents to turn in discrete steps, rather than continuously as an analog axis, to allow the operator to more easily intuit how far they are scrolling.

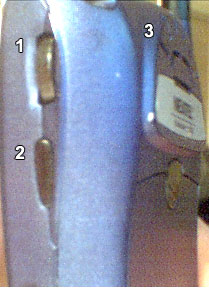
Trackwheel (1) on a BlackBerry

Scroll wheels are prevalent on modern computer mice and have become an integral part of the hardware interface. However, non-wheeled mice are still available.

Some user interfaces, like Cinnamon, allow using it to adjust brightness and volume by pointing at the respective taskbar icon and rolling the wheel. Spinners and drop-down lists in most toolkits also allow adjustment of the value using mouse wheel.

== History ==
The scroll wheel on a mouse has been invented multiple times by different people unaware of the others' work.

Other scrolling controls on a mouse, and the use of a wheel for scrolling both precede the combination of wheel and mouse. The earliest known example of the former is the Mighty Mouse prototype developed jointly by NTT, Japan and ETH Zürich, Switzerland (Kunio Ōno, Ken'ichi Fukaya and Jürg Nievergelt) in 1985. It had a thumb-operated combined analog button/toggle switch on the side for smooth scrolling.

At the ACM SIGCHI conference in 1989, Gina Danielle Venolia from Apple presented a mouse prototype with a horizontal thumb-wheel for scrolling, or for navigating inwards and outwards: zooming or along the third axis in 3D space. In her patent application from 1992 there are two vertical wheels, left and right of the button(s), both mechanically linked to the same shaft; there are also a number of alternative designs. (A 1993 paper from Venolia names the linked-double-roller version the "roller mouse", and a number of academic papers used that name.)

In 1995, the Taiwanese company KYE Systems released the first commercial mouse with scroll wheel. It was named Genius EasyScroll and was also available as Mouse Systems ProAgio.

The scroll wheel was popularized by the Microsoft IntelliMouse in 1996 along with support for the mouse wheel in Microsoft Office 97. It had been based on ideas developed by Eric Michelman since 1993 with input from Chris Graham.

Scroll wheels can also be found on PDAs and mobiles phones such as early Sony models, BlackBerry devices and Nokia 7110, which usually have the function of navigating through menus. They have also appeared on keyboards, particularly on Logitech and Microsoft models, usually located to the left of the caps lock key.

== Alternatives ==
Instead of a scroll-wheel, some mice (and other devices) use an alternative but similar component.

Laptop computers often include a touchpad programmed with a pointing device gesture that mimics a scroll-wheel (either by dedicating an edge of the pad for scrolling, or activating scrolling through a multitouch gesture), or mimics a scroll-wheel button click (by clicking both the left and right buttons simultaneously, to activate omni-directional scrolling). Many Linux distributions offer a method of scrolling using the touchpad where the user will first activate scroll-mode by pressing in a corner of the pad, and then dragging in a circle around the center of the pad; letting go of the touchpad will switch back to the default mouse-mode.

In mice, alternatives include scroll balls (similar to trackballs, such as on Apple's Mighty Mouse and some serial or PS/2 mice, which combine horizontal and vertical scrolling), pointing sticks, integrated touchpads (as on Apple's Magic Mouse) or optical sensors. Unusual examples include a joystick-style hatswitch present on an early Saitek mouse, and a central 4-way switch-pad found on the Cherry Power Pad Mouse M-1000. Genius also offered the simpler NetMouse in the late 1990s, which had a two-way rocker switch instead of a wheel, marketed as the Magic Scroll Button. Kensington currently offers several models of trackball mice with a large "scroll ring" that surrounds the ball itself and is rotated using multiple fingers instead of only the index finger as on the scroll wheel of a conventional mouse.

Some ThinkPad laptops allow scrolling using the pointing stick by holding a button above the touch pad.

== Other applications ==
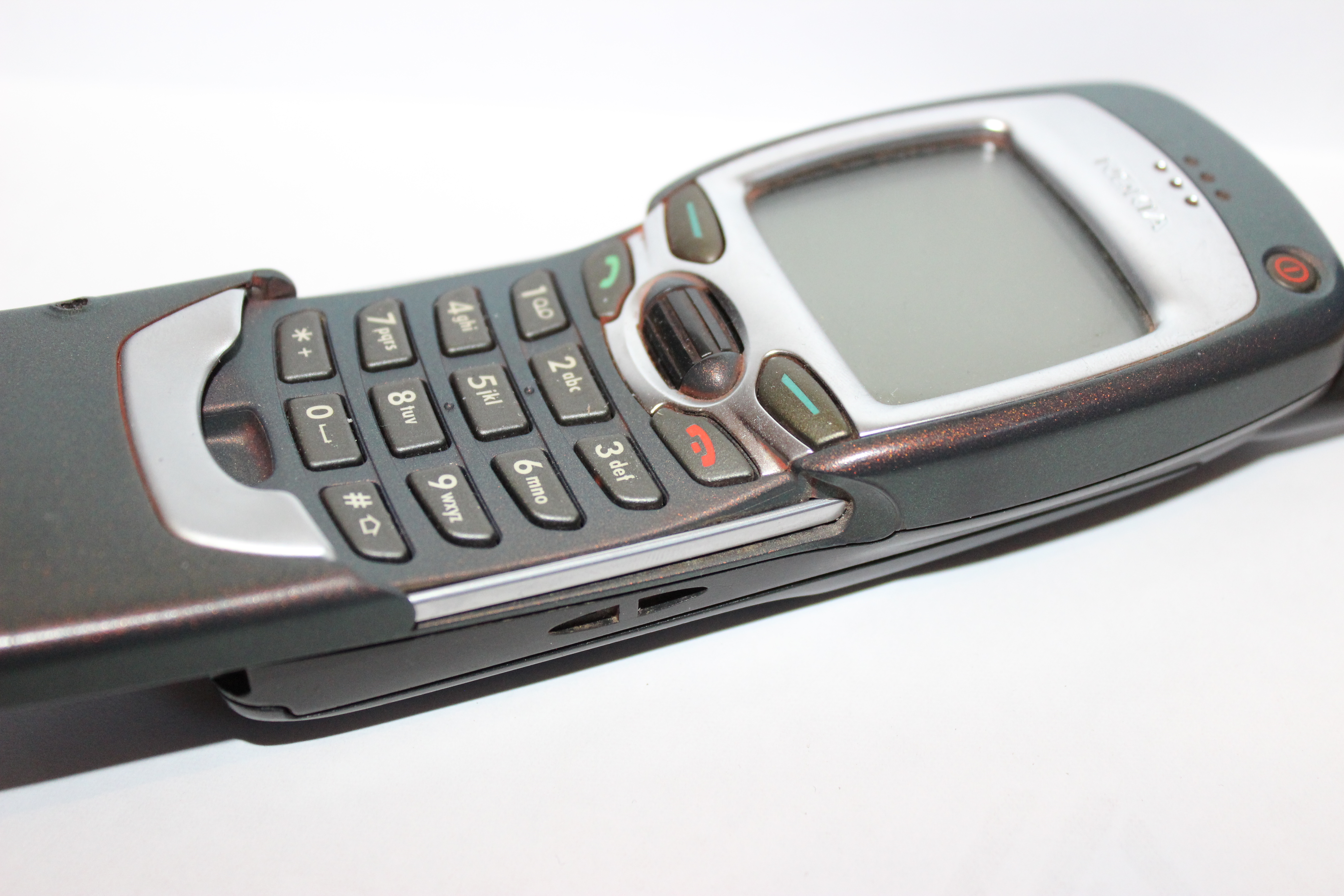
Scroll wheel on a Nokia 7110

Scroll-wheel motion is often used to control other aspects of a system. For instance, it can allow the user to switch between a series of options, zoom in or out, or increment/decrement any value.

In first-person shooter computer games, scroll wheels are often used to switch between weapons or even to allow the player to lean left and right if horizontal scrolling is available or zoom in/out a telescopic sight. Some of them and most real-time strategy games also use the scroll wheel to zoom in and out of the player's view.

CAD applications such as Autodesk's AutoCAD use the mouse wheel to navigate the space in which the user is drawing. This has become a de facto standard in many 3D applications, with Trimble's SketchUp (formerly owned by Google) using the scroll wheel to zoom in and out in the 3D space, while a wheel-click and a mouse drag is orbit.

== See also ==
- Scroll lock
