= Microsoft Fresh Paint =

Digital graphics editor

Fresh Paint

- Developer(s): Microsoft
- Initial release: May 25, 2012; 13 years ago
- Stable release: 3.1.10383.1000
- Operating system: Windows 8 and later, Windows Phone 8 and later
- Platform: Universal Windows Platform
- Available in: 30 languages
- List of languages English (American and British), Arabic, Catalan, Chinese (PRC, Hong Kong SAR and Taiwan), Danish, Filipino, Finnish, French (European and Canadian), German, Hebrew, Indonesian, Italian, Japanese, Korean, Malay, Norwegian (Bokmål), Polish, Portuguese (Brazilian and European), Russian, Spanish, Swedish, Taiwanese, Thai, Turkish, Ukrainian
- Type: Graphics software
- License: Freemium
- Website: www.microsoft.com/store/productid/9wzdncrfjb13

Fresh Paint is a painting app developed by Microsoft and released on May 25, 2012.

== History ==
Fresh Paint originated from a Microsoft Research project known as Project Gustav, an endeavor to reproduce the behavior of physical oil paint on a digital medium. To push the boundaries of simulating oil on a digital medium, the research team created a physics model that precisely replicated on a screen what would happen in the real world if you combined oil, a surface and a tool such as a paint brush. Two publications, Detail-Preserving Paint Modeling for 3D Brushes and Simple Data-Driven Modeling of Brushes, were released as a result of the team’s findings.

After a variety of internal testing Project, Gustav was codenamed Digital Art. Partnering with The Museum of Modern Art, Digital Art was tested for a year by 60,000 people. With feedback culled from MoMA, developers expanded the existing physics model, experimenting with how real oil paint blended and reacted to the texture of a canvas. After final adjustments were made, Digital Art was rebranded as Fresh Paint. It was released to the public on 25 May 2012.

== See also ==
- Digital art
- Museum of Modern Art
- Digital painting
- Microsoft Paint
- ArtRage
