= KYE Systems =

Taiwanese computer peripheral manufacturer

KYE Systems Group
- Logo of KYE's Genius brand
- Industry: Computer; electronics
- Founded: 1983 in Taipei, Taiwan
- Founder: James Jwo; Albert Chen
- Products: Peripherals; consumer electronics

KYE Systems Group, or KYE, an abbreviation of Kung Ying Enterprises (Chinese: 迎廣科技股份有限公司), is a Taiwanese computer peripheral manufacturer that designs and manufactures and markets human interface devices such as mice under their own brand, Genius. The company also manufactures on an OEM basis for companies such as HP and Microsoft. The company was founded in 1983 and has opened offices internationally.

== History ==
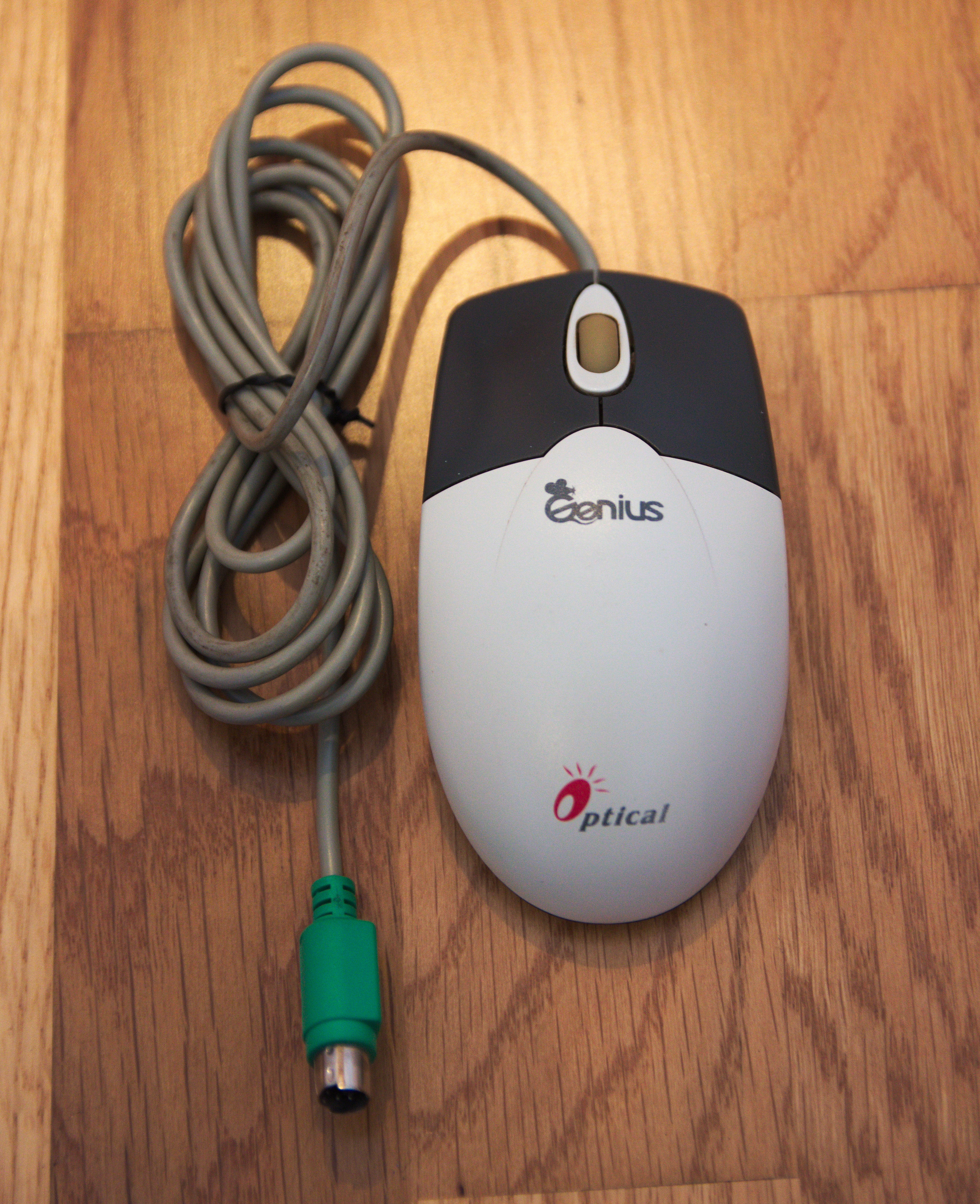
An early-2000s optical mouse built by KYE and branded as Genius

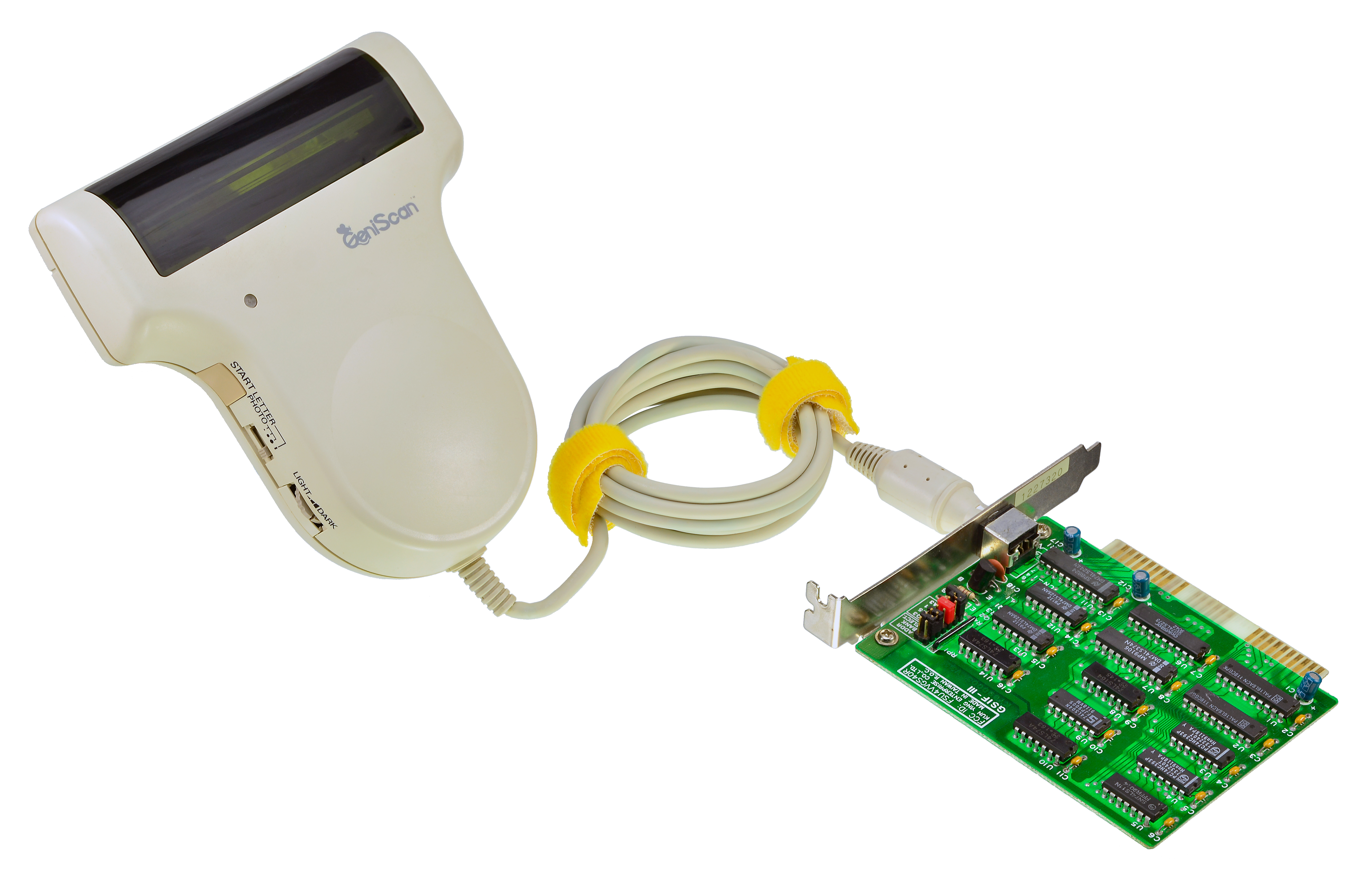
A KYE-built GeniScan GS-4500 hand scanner

KYE Systems was founded in 1983 in Taipei, Taiwan, by James Jwo (born c. 1959) and Albert Chen. The company originally did not manufacture peripherals but was instead a systems integrator, assembling IBM PC clones for international export, as part of the company's start-up stage. KYE was founded with US$40,000 in capital; Jwo described himself at first having "little money and few connections". In 1984, the company began developing computer peripherals, namely computer mice, for export. In 1985, they introduced their Genius brand of mice, which had become a popular brand in the United States by the late 1980s, according to PC Week. In 1986, they established KYE International Corporation in the United States in Walnut, California, filing its formal articles of incorporation in 1988. In 1990, the KYE International acquired Mouse Systems, a pioneering peripheral manufacturer of Fremont, California. This acquisition expanded KYE's dealer network and allowed them to absorb Mouse Systems' patents on optical mice technology.

KYE continued to expand their international presence in the 1990s, establishing marketing subsidiaries in the United Kingdom in 1991, in Germany in 1993, and in Hong Kong in 1995. Also in 1995, the company opened a large factory in Shenzhen, China, to complement the company's manufacturing of mice in their home factory of Sanchong, Taiwan, which they purchased in 1987. In 1997, the assembly lines in Shenzhen were expanded to produce image scanners, and in 1998, KYE opened up another factory in nearby Dongguan, China.

KYE had their hands in the manufacturing of multimedia products in the early 1990s, producing graphics cards, and sound cards. A subsidiary devoted to publishing multimedia CD-ROMs was opened in 1993, but KYE folded it in 1996.

In 1997, the company introduced the Genius EasyScroll (also sold as the Mouse Systems ProAgio), the first commercially produced mouse with a scroll wheel. The company held the American patents on scroll-wheel technology through to at least 2009.

KYE by 2010 had an OEM roster of Hewlett-Packard (later HP Inc.), Samsung, Acer, Asus, Best Buy, Foxconn, Microsoft, and Logitech. Microsoft was KYE's largest client in 2010, accounting for 30 percent of KYE's output; KYE built some of Microsoft's Xbox controllers and webcams from their factory in Dongguan.

An April 2010 report by the National Labor Committee wrote of sweatshop-like conditions at the Dongguan factory, which had been recruiting 16- to 18-year-old women for summer jobs. According to the NCL's report, the students worked 15-hour shifts, six or seven days a week, and during breaks rested in cramped dormitories. Pay for the students was set to 65¢ per hour, with a 13¢ deduction for cafeteria services. A single line of 20 to 30 employees had to complete 2,000 Microsoft mice in 12 hours, with management raising the production goal after each shift. The NLC report wrote that the factory was crowded, with nearly 1,000 sharing a roughly 11,025 square foot room, and that workers were prohibited from conversing, listening to music, or using the bathroom outside of breaks. Following the report, Microsoft stated that they had begun taking "appropriate remedial measures in regard to any findings of vendor misconduct", in accordance with their code of conduct for vendors. KYE Systems responded that they set their wages commensurate with Chinese labor regulations and called the report "a one-sided story without offering us a chance to explain". Chinese government officials on April 19, 2010, cited KYE with failing to register nearly 326 workers between the ages of 16 and 18 and imposing excessive amounts of overtime—280 collective hours a week, over the allotted 196. Officials forced KYE to rectify the cited complaints within two weeks.

Between 2008 and 2012, KYE's revenue share in computer peripherals dropped from 69 percent in 2008 to 43 percent, while its revenue share in optical imaging and consumer electronics both grew, from 12 percent and 17 percent respectively in 2008 to roughly a quarter each in 2012. In the third quarter of 2013, the company reported an operating income of NT$64 million.
