= PC Paintbrush =

1984 graphics editing software for MS-DOS

- Developer: ZSoft Corporation
- Release: 1984; 42 years ago
- Stable release: PC Paintbrush Designer / 1994; 32 years ago
- Operating system: MS-DOS, Microsoft Windows
- Type: Graphics software

PC Paintbrush is a graphics editing software created by the ZSoft Corporation in 1984 for computers running the MS-DOS operating system.

Published alongside Microsoft Mouse DOS drivers version 4 from 1985 as a direct response to Mouse Systems bundling PCPaint with its mice, millions of copies were sold, and the program itself ended up licensed and used inside Windows 1.0, as Microsoft Paint; with an updated version licensed again for Windows 3.0, which (in an updated state) is still included in Windows today.

== History ==
It was developed at a similar time to various bitmap paint programs for home computers such as PCPaint, which had been published in 1984 by Mouse Systems, who bundled it with their IBM PC mouses.

PC Paintbrush also competed with Apple Paint on the Apple II and MacPaint on Apple Computer's new Macintosh platform.

When PC Paintbrush was released in 1984, it had support for EGA.

PC Paintbrush was published as included software by Microsoft, with the early Microsoft Mouse, from version 4 of the DOS drivers in 1985. Both Microsoft and their competitor, Mouse Systems, bundled their mice with paint programs to drive sales.

Microsoft's mechanical mice outsold Mouse Systems' optical mice after a few years. Microsoft eventually bought the rights to use PC Paintbrush and incorporated it into Windows 1 in a cut-down edition, and bought the rights to a later more featured version of PC Paintbrush for Windows 3.

Along with the release of PC Paintbrush, ZSoft created the PCX image format, also used by Paint and Paintbrush in early Windows.

== Version history ==
The first version of PC Paintbrush released in 1984 only allowed the use of a limited EGA 16-color palette.

PC Paintbrush II was released in 1985.

PC Paintbrush 3.10 was released in 1986.

PC Paintbrush Plus 1.20 was released in 1987.

In 1987 a Microsoft licensed version was released as Microsoft Paintbrush 2.0. It supported saving images in PCX or GX1 file formats. It featured adjustable palettes, different aspect ratios, fifteen fonts and supported printers, amongst other options. A Windows 1 and 2 version, named PC Paintbrush 1.05 for Microsoft Windows was released the same year. A version called Publisher's Paintbrush allowed import of images via TWAIN-based capture devices like handheld and flatbed scanners.

PC Paintbrush III was released in 1988, allowing 256 colors and extended SVGA resolutions were supported through the use of hundreds of custom-tailored graphics drivers. The PCX format grew in capability accordingly. By its final version, Paintbrush was able to open and save PCX, TIFF, and GIF files.

PC Paintbrush IV was released in 1989. PC Paintbrush IV Plus, an updated version released the same year, supporting scanners. Also in 1989, PC Paintbrush Plus 1.12 for Windows was released, eventually becoming the Windows Paint program.

PC Paintbrush Plus for Windows v1.5 was released in 1990.

PC Paintbrush V+ came in 1992.

PC Paintbrush for Windows 1.0 was adapted to the Windows 3.0 graphical environment in 1993. Support for 24-bit color and simple photo retouching tools were also added, as well as the ability to open more than one image at a time. The program also added many simulations of real-world media, such as oil paints, watercolors, and colored pencils, and it had a number of new smudge tools that took advantage of the increased color depth.

Both PC Paintbrush and Publisher's Paintbrush were supplemented and later replaced with the more budget-oriented PhotoFinish, first released in 1991, with version 4 released in 1994.

After ZSoft was sold, resold, and then finally absorbed by The Learning Company, an extremely low-priced and simple graphics application was released in 1994 under the title PC Paintbrush Designer.

== See also ==
- Mouse Systems
