= Microsoft Paint =

Raster graphics editor

- Paint on Windows 11, with the Layers panel open on the side
- Other names: Paintbrush (1985–1995)
- Developer: Microsoft

Stable release(s) [±]
- Windows 11: September 2026 Update (11.2609.401) / November 4, 2026; 1 day ago
- Windows 10, discontinued: 10.0 (Build 19041.5553) / February 25, 2025; 20 months ago
- Operating system: Windows 11
- Platform: IA-32, x86-64, and ARM (historically Itanium, DEC Alpha, MIPS, and PowerPC)
- Included with: All Microsoft Windows versions
- Type: Raster graphics editor
- Website: microsoft.com/windows/paint

Microsoft Paint (more commonly known as MS Paint or simply Paint) is a simple raster graphics editor that has been included with all versions of Microsoft Windows. The program opens, modifies, and saves image files in Windows bitmap (BMP), JPEG, GIF, PNG, and single-page TIFF formats. The program can be in color mode or two-color black-and-white, but there is no grayscale mode. For its simplicity and wide availability, it rapidly became one of the most used Windows applications, introducing many to painting on a computer for the first time.

In July 2017, Microsoft added Paint to the list of deprecated features of Windows 10 and announced that it had become a free standalone application in Microsoft Store, with Paint 3D as its replacement. However, as a result of public demand from users, Paint has continued to be included with Windows 10 and even Windows 11, with Microsoft instead deprecating Paint 3D. Windows 11 also includes a version of Paint in later versions that added, among other updates, an updated UI and dark mode support.

== History ==
Paint was initially programmed, licensed and adapted from PC Paintbrush made by ZSoft, by Dan McCabe at Microsoft for Windows 1.0, released in late 1985. PC Paintbrush had been previously licensed and published with the Microsoft Mouse DOS drivers from version 4 (circa 1985), to compete with Mouse Systems publishing PCPaint with its own mice in 1984. PC Paintbrush’s inclusion in version 4 of the DOS drivers replaced the previously included Microsoft bitmap color editing application "Doodle", released in 1983 with the first version of the Microsoft Mouse drivers. With improved functionality over Doodle, it competed successfully against PCPaint and Mouse Systems. Paint included with the first version of Windows, Windows 1.0 in November 1985, had 24 tools, supported only monochrome graphics, and could read and write files only in the proprietary "MSP" format. Aside from "pencil" and "shape" tools and a brush that draws in 24 "brush shapes and patterns", the toolset also contained two features unique for the time: one the ability to draw Bézier curves and the other that forces lines to be drawn on three angles to create an isometric three-quarter perspective. Microsoft has since deprecated the MSP format, repurposing the MSP extension for the Windows Installer Package format.

Paint was later superseded by Paintbrush in Windows 3.0, with a redesigned user interface, true color support, and support for the BMP and PCX file formats. This version was also based on a newer licensed version of PC Paintbrush by ZSoft.

=== Windows 9x ===
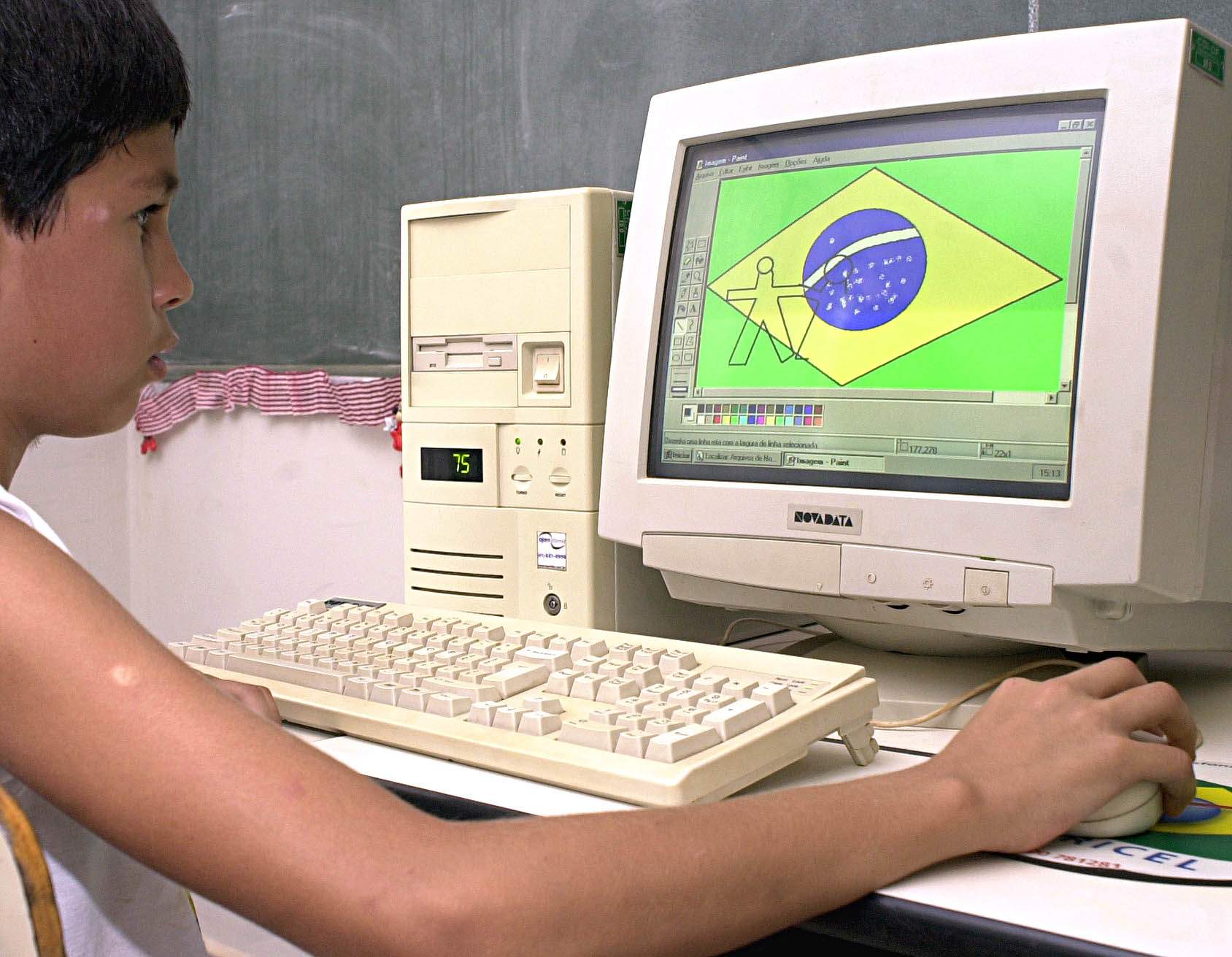
Brazilian boy drawing the Brazilian flag on a Windows 95 computer running Microsoft Paint, 2005

Microsoft shipped an updated version of Paint with Windows 95 and Windows NT 4.0. At this point, Microsoft began updating the source code entirely from scratch and did not license any further code or versions of PC Paintbrush. This version featured an updated user interface that would carry on to later versions of Windows up to Windows Vista and allows saving and loading custom color palettes as .pal files. This functionality only works correctly if the color depth of images is 16 bits per pixel (bpp) or higher. Later versions of Paint do not support this feature.

In Windows 95–98, Windows 2000 and Windows Me, Paint can open JPEG, GIF and 48-bit (16-bpp) TIF images and save images in JPEG and GIF formats when appropriate graphics filters are installed. Such plug-ins are included with Microsoft Office and Microsoft PhotoDraw. This also allows Paint to use transparent backgrounds. Support for PCX files was dropped. Starting with Windows Me, the canvas size expands automatically when larger images are opened or pasted instead of asking like in previous versions of Windows.

=== Windows XP and Vista ===
In Windows XP and later, Paint uses GDI+ and therefore can natively save images as BMP, JPEG, GIF, TIFF and PNG without requiring additional graphics filters. Support for saving and loading custom color palettes was dropped.

In Windows Vista, the toolbar icons were updated and the default color palette was changed. Paint in Windows Vista can undo a change up to 10 times, compared to 3 in previous versions; it also includes a slider for image magnification and a crop function. This version saves in JPEG format by default.

=== Windows 7 and 8.x ===
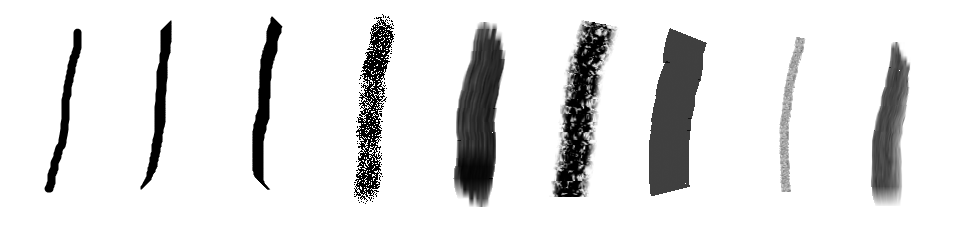
Artistic brushes in Paint for Windows 7

The version of Paint in Windows 7 and later features a ribbon in its user interface. It also features "artistic" brushes composed of varying shades of gray and some degree of transparency that give a more realistic result. To add to the realism, the oil and watercolor brushes can only paint for a small distance before the user must re-click (this gives the illusion that the paintbrush has run out of paint). In addition, Paint can now undo up to 50 subsequent changes. It also has anti-aliased shapes, which can be resized freely until they are rasterized when another tool is selected. This version supports viewing (but not saving) transparent PNG and ICO file formats and saves files in the .png file format by default.

Text can now be pasted into text boxes that don't have enough room to display the text. A text box can then be enlarged or reshaped appropriately to fit the text if desired. Previous versions of Paint would display an error message if a user tried to paste more text than there was room for.

The Windows 8 version of Paint mostly corrects a long-standing defect from previous versions involving the inability to scroll the window when editing in Zoom view over 100%. However, when the user inserts text in Zoom view, they cannot move the text beyond the zoomed viewport while the text window is in edit mode with either the mouse or keyboard.

=== Windows 10 ===
In the April 2017 "Creators Update" for Windows 10, Microsoft released Paint 3D alongside Paint. In addition to the traditional two-dimensional drawing tools, Paint 3D can import and manipulate three-dimensional models. Three months later, on July 23, 2017, Microsoft added Paint to the list of deprecated Windows features. The next day, in the wake of "an incredible outpouring of support and nostalgia", Microsoft clarified that Paint would become a free app on Microsoft Store, even though Paint 3D offers the same functionality.

Despite the deprecation, Paint continues to be a part of all versions of Windows 10 up to version 22H2. The closest that Microsoft ever got to enacting said decision was adding a removal notice to Paint's user interface in Windows 10 versions 1803 and 1809.

In March 2021, with the release of Windows 10 Insider build 21332 to the Dev Channel, Microsoft removed Paint 3D from clean installations of the build, in addition to the 3D Objects app. In April 2021, Microsoft released Windows 10 Insider build 21354, which made Paint (along with Snipping Tool) updatable from the Microsoft Store. It had also been moved from the Windows Accessories folder of the Start menu to its own section.

=== Windows 11 ===
In August 2021, Microsoft teased an updated version of Paint for Windows 11, featuring a refreshed user interface (UI), improved font picker, and a dark theme. This newly updated version of Paint was released with Windows 11 Insider build 22468 in September 2021, and was officially released as part of the Windows 11 2022 Update in September 2022. In September 2023, Microsoft released an update that added layers, support for transparent PNG files, AI art generation based on DALL-E, other AI tools and a background removal tool. By late 2025, users reported that the pencil brush cursor displayed as a circular outline rather than a single-pixel preview following a recent update.

Despite new features being added into Paint in Windows 11, some older features have disappeared such as the color-replace brush feature. Paint in Windows 11 also automatically anti-aliases all fonts that are inputted using the "Text" feature. Smaller images are also harder to manipulate and work with in newer versions of Paint, as it automatically blurs images when they are resized or re-copied. This is especially noticeable when working with video game sprites and pixel art. These issues are due to interpolation algorithms that Paint is using, according to Microsoft.

== Features ==
Paint has a few functions not mentioned in the help file: a stamp mode, trail mode, regular shapes, and moving pictures. For the stamp mode, the user can select a part of the image, hold the Ctrl key, and move it to another part of the canvas. This, instead of cutting the piece out, creates a copy of it. The process can be repeated as many times as desired, as long as the Ctrl key is held down. The trail mode works exactly the same, but it uses the ⇧ Shift instead of the Ctrl key.

It is also possible to thicken or thin a line either before or simultaneously while it is being drawn via Ctrl++ (NumPad only) or Ctrl+- (NumPad only).

To crop whitespace or eliminate parts of a graphic, the blue handle in the lower right corner can be dragged to increase canvas size or crop a graphic. Users can also draw perfect shapes (which have a width equal to the height) using any shape tool by holding down the ⇧ Shift while dragging.

Older versions of Paint, such as the one bundled with Windows 3.1, featured a color-replace brush, which replaced a single color underneath the brush with another without affecting the rest of the image. In later versions of Paint, the color erase brush was removed as an option, however it can still be simulated by selecting the color to be replaced as the primary color, and the one it is replaced with as the secondary color, and then right-click dragging the erase tool.

=== Support for indexed palettes ===
By default, almost all versions of Paint are generally unable to properly downgrade created images to indexed palettes using fewer than 24 bits per pixel. When saving an image in a format that uses indexed palettes with fewer than 24 bits per pixel, a warning message appears about the loss of quality. Paint does not utilize binary, color or grayscale dithering or palette optimization, and the image will be saved with usually irreversibly scrambled colors.

Paint is nonetheless able to correctly load and save indexed palettes in any of the supported formats if an image is opened as an 8-bit or otherwise indexed palette image. In that case, the image's palette is preserved when saving. However, there is no way to see the actual palette; color choices for brushes, text, and erasers as well as user-defined colors will be limited to the closest available color in the indexed palette.

== See also ==
=== Bundled Paint equivalents on other OSes ===
- Deluxe Paint, for Amiga
- KolourPaint, for KDE
- MacPaint, for Macintosh
- Pinta, for GNOME
- Pocket Paint, for Windows CE

=== Miscellaneous ===
- Comparison of raster graphics editors
- Microsoft Fresh Paint
- GIMP
- Pixel art, a form of digital art
