= LView =

Raster graphics editor

LView Pro
- Developer: CoolMoon Corp
- Release: Early 1993; 33 years ago
- Stable release: 2006 / May 2006; 20 years ago
- Operating system: Microsoft Windows
- Type: Bitmap graphics editor / Image viewer
- License: Proprietary
- Website: www.lview.com

LView Pro (LVP) is a bitmap graphics editor for computers running the Microsoft Windows operating system developed by Leonardo H. Loureiro, who owns the copyright to the software and the LView registered trademark. LView Pro is distributed by CoolMoon Corp.

== Commercial history ==
The first version of LView software, 1.0, was released as freeware on the Internet in early 1993, and was the Windows based image viewer bundled with the pioneer web browser Mosaic.

In 1994, the first version of LView Pro was sold as a shareware product by MMedia Research. Retail versions of LView Pro, 2.0 and newer, were introduced in 1997. LView quickly gained popularity and was frequently ranked above Corel Paint Shop Pro, McAfee VirusScan, Netscape Communicator, Internet Explorer, Quake II, and others, on CNET's Download.com list of the most popular downloads in all categories.

In 2001, versions of LView Pro started being titled using the year of release, the current version - as of May 2006 - is labeled LView Pro 2006.

In June 2005, after a 12-year run with MMedia Research, distribution rights to LView Pro were transferred to CoolMoon Corp.

In October 2017, after a 12-year run with CoolMoon Corp, registration fees for the use of LView Pro 2006 were waived by the author of the software.

== Version history ==
LView software started as a pioneer JPEG viewer, one of the first to be available for download on the Internet. Major versions 1.* (1.0 to 1.D2) offered limited image editing capabilities (crop, rotate, color adjustments, etc.) in addition to common image viewing operations (zooming, slideshows, etc.).

Major versions 2.x (2.0 to 2.85) featured more extensive editing capabilities (brushes, selections, histograms, gradients, etc.) as well as new editors for Web Picture Galleries, Contact Sheets, and others. Versions from 2001 to the current, support advanced image editing tools (layers, transparency, objects, etc.), similar to those found on commercial titles like Adobe Photoshop.
