= Lithium vanadium phosphate battery =

Proposed type of battery

A lithium vanadium phosphate (LVP) battery is a proposed type of lithium-ion battery that uses a vanadium phosphate in the cathode. As of 2016 they have not been commercialized.

== Research ==
Vanadium phosphates have been investigated as potential cathodes for Li-ion batteries: including lithium vanadium phosphate, Li_{3}V_{2}(PO_{4})_{3}; the same material prepared by sol gel methods showed lithium insertion/removal over a 3.5 to 4.1 V range, with evidence of three stages of insertion/removal.

ɛ-VOPO_{4} has been studied as a cathode material and has a two stage lithium insertion/removal process. Nanostructured ɛ-VOPO_{4} has been studied as a potential redox material.
