= PCX =

Image file format

- Filename extension: .pcx
- Internet media type: image/vnd.zbrush.pcx, image/x-pcx (deprecated)
- Developed by: ZSoft Corporation
- Initial release: 1985; 41 years ago
- Latest release: 5; 1991; 35 years ago
- Type of format: Lossless bitmap image format

PCX, standing for PiCture eXchange, is an image file format developed by the now-defunct ZSoft Corporation of Marietta, Georgia, United States. It was the native file format for PC Paintbrush and became one of the first widely accepted DOS imaging standards, although it has since been succeeded by more sophisticated image formats, such as BMP, JPEG, and PNG. PCX files commonly store palette-indexed images ranging from 2 or 4 colors to 16 and 256 colors, although the format has been extended to record true-color (24-bit) images as well.

== PCX image formats ==
PCX was designed during the early development of PC display hardware and most of the formats are no longer used. The table below shows a list of the most commonly used PCX formats. Contemporary image editing programs may not read PCX files that match older hardware.

Common PCX Image Formats
Bit Depth	Planes	Number of Colors
4	1	16 colors from a palette
8	1	256 colors from a palette
8	1	256 shades of gray
4	4	4096 colors with 16 levels of transparency
8	3	16.7 million, 24-bit "true color"
8	4	16.7 million with 256 levels of transparency
1	1	2 colors monochrome (1-Bit) (Win 3.1 Paintbrush)
1	4	16 colors RGBi (4-Bit) in 4 planes (Win 3.1 Paintbrush)

PCX is understood and produced by common image processing software including ACDSee, FastStone, GIMP, ImageMagick, IrfanView, LView, Netpbm, PaintShop Pro, Photoshop, Visio, PMview, XnView and GraphicConverter. In version 2.1.4 FFmpeg could encode and decode the PCX pixel formats rgb24, rgb8, bgr8, rgb4_byte, bgr4_byte, gray, pal8, and monob.

There is a multi-page version of PCX, used by some computer fax and document management programs, with file extension .dcx. A DCX file consists of a header introducing a set of following PCX files.

== PCX file format ==
PCX files were designed for use on IBM-compatible PCs and always use little endian byte ordering. A PCX file has three main sections, in the following order

1. 128-byte header
2. image data
3. (optional) 256-color palette

The PCX file header contains an identifier byte (value 10), a version number, image dimensions, 16 palette colors, number color planes, bit depth of each plane, and a value for compression method. PCX version numbers range from 0 to 5, this originally denoted the version of the PC Paintbrush program used to create the PCX file. The header always has space for 16 colors though the number of colors used depends upon the bit depth of the image. The header is composed of 18 fields:

Offset hex	Offset dec	Size	Purpose
00	0	1 byte	The fixed header field valued at a hexadecimal 0x0A (= 10 in decimal).
01	1	1 byte	The version number referring to the Paintbrush software release, which might be: 0 PC Paintbrush version 2.5 using a fixed EGA palette 2 PC Paintbrush version 2.8 using a modifiable EGA palette 3 PC Paintbrush version 2.8 using no palette 4 PC Paintbrush for Windows 5 PC Paintbrush version 3.0, including 24-bit images
02	2	1 byte	The method used for encoding the image data. Can be: 0 No encoding (rarely used) 1 Run-length encoding (RLE)
03	3	1 byte	The number of bits constituting one plane. Most often 1, 2, 4 or 8.
04	4	2 bytes	The minimum x co-ordinate of the image position.
06	6	2 bytes	The minimum y co-ordinate of the image position.
08	8	2 bytes	The maximum x co-ordinate of the image position.
0A	10	2 bytes	The maximum y co-ordinate of the image position.
0C	12	2 bytes	The horizontal image resolution in DPI.
0E	14	2 bytes	The vertical image resolution in DPI.
10	16	48 bytes	The EGA palette for 16-color images.
40	64	1 byte	The first reserved field, usually set to zero.
41	65	1 byte	The number of color planes constituting the pixel data. Mostly chosen to be 1, 3, or 4.
42	66	2 bytes	The number of bytes of one color plane representing a single scan line.
44	68	2 bytes	The mode in which to construe the palette: 1 The palette contains monochrome or color information 2 The palette contains grayscale information
46	70	2 bytes	The horizontal resolution of the source system's screen.
48	72	2 bytes	The vertical resolution of the source system's screen.
4A	74	54 bytes	The second reserved field, intended for future extensions, and usually set to zero bytes.

All PCX files use the same compression scheme and the compression value is always 1. No other values have been defined and there are no uncompressed PCX files. One source claims that 0 (uncompressed) is allowed, but not much software supports it.

=== Image data layout ===
PCX image data is stored in rows or scan lines in top-down order. If the image has multiple planes, these are stored by plane within row, such that all the red data for row 0 are followed by all the green data for row 0, then all the blue data, then alpha data. This pattern is repeated for each line as shown in the next table:

PCX Image Data Arranged into Color Planes
Row 0	R R R R R R R R R
Row 0	G G G G G G G G G
Row 0	B B B B B B B B B
Row 0	A A A A A A A A A
Row 1	R R R R R R R R R
Row 1	G G G G G G G G G
Row 1	B B B B B B B B B
Row 1	A A A A A A A A A
Row 2 etc.	....

When an image is less than 8 bits per pixel, each line is padded to the next even byte boundary. For example, if an image has 1 plane of 1-bit data (monochrome) with a width of 22 pixels, each row will be 4 bytes long, having 32 bits per row with 10 bits unused.

=== Image data compression ===
PCX image data are compressed using run-length encoding (RLE), a simple lossless compression algorithm that collapses a series of three or more consecutive bytes with identical values into a two-byte pair. The two most-significant bits of a byte are used to determine whether the given data represent a single pixel of a given palette index or color value, or an RLE pair representing a series of several pixels of a single value:

1. If both bits are 1, the byte is interpreted as the run length. This leaves 6 bits for the actual run length value, a range of 0-63.
2. In any other case, the byte is interpreted as a single pixel value. This leaves all values for which bit #7 and bit #8 are not 1 at the same time. This allows all values under 192 to be encoded in a single byte.

Due to the use of the two most-significant bits as flags, pixel values from 192 to 255 (with their most-significant bit already set) must be stored in an RLE byte pair, even when they only occur one or two pixels in succession, whereas color indexes 0 to 191 can be stored directly or in RLE byte pairs (whichever is more space-efficient); therefore, the actual compression ratio could be optimized with proper sorting of palette entries, though this is not feasible where the file must share its color palette with other images. For example, a palette could be optimized with the most commonly used colors occurring in palette positions 0 to 191 and the least common colors allocated to the remaining quarter of the palette.

Another "inefficiency" with the RLE algorithm is that it is possible to store chunks with a length of 0, which allows whitespace in the file. This is because otherwise the length would have to be incremented once which would slow down decompression slightly, this allowed PCX files to be decompressed faster on the processors it was originally intended for.

The PCX compression algorithm requires very little processor power or memory to apply, a significant concern with computer systems when it was designed. Compression algorithms used by newer image formats are more efficient when compressing images such as photographs, and dithered or otherwise complex graphics.

=== Color palette ===
A PCX file has space in its header for a 16 color palette. When 256-color VGA hardware became available there was not enough space for the palette in a PCX file; even the 54 unused bytes after the header would not be enough. The solution chosen was to put the palette at the end of the file, along with a marker byte to confirm its existence.

If a PCX file has a 256-color palette, it is found 768 bytes from the end of the file. In this case the value in the byte preceding the palette should be 12 (0x0C). The palette is stored as a sequence of RGB triples; its usable length is defined by the number of colors in the image. Color values in a PCX palette always use 8 bits, regardless of the bit depth of the image.
