= Image conversion =

Change of image file format

In computing, Image conversion is the process of transforming an input image into a different format.

A large number of image file formats are available for storing graphical data, and, consequently, there are a number of issues associated with converting from one image format to another, most notably loss of image detail.

== Software compatibility ==
Many image formats are native to one specific graphics application and are not offered as an export option in other software, due to proprietary considerations. An example of this is Adobe Photoshop's native PSD-format (Prevention of Significant Deterioration), which cannot be opened in less sophisticated programs for image viewing or editing, such as Microsoft Paint. Most image editing software is capable of importing and exporting in a variety of formats though, and a number of dedicated image converters exist.

== Loss due to compression ==
Besides uncompressed formats and lossless compression formats that can usually be interconverted without any loss of detail, there are compressed formats such as JPEG, which lose detail on nearly every compress. While a conversion from a compressed to an uncompressed format is in general without loss, this is not true the other way around. Even a compressed-uncompressed-compressed round trip without any image manipulation may incur some loss of detail.

== Loss due to format change ==
Like any resampling operation, changing image size and bit depth are lossy in all cases of downsampling, such as 30-bit to 24-bit or 24-bit to 8-bit palette-based images. While increasing bit depth is usually lossless, increasing image size can introduce aliasing or other undesired artifacts.

== RAW images ==
More expensive digital cameras usually offer the option to shoot in Raw image format. RAW is not a standardized format, in fact, RAW-formats even differ between camera models from the same vendor. Data in a RAW-file is structured according to the Bayer filter's pattern in cameras that use a single image sensor. Debayering, the process of obtaining bitmap data from a RAW-image is always a lossy operation. In addition, some downsampling is always performed, again reducing image information.

== See also ==
- Comparison of graphics file formats
- Image organizer
- Image viewer
