= Mouse Systems =

Mouse Systems Corporation
- Formerly: Rodent Associates
- Company type: Private
- Industry: Computer peripherals
- Founded: 1982; 44 years ago in Fremont, California
- Founder: Steve Kirsch
- Defunct: 1990
- Fate: Acquired by KYE Systems
- Products: Computer mice

Mouse Systems Corporation (MSC), formerly Rodent Associates, was founded in 1982 by Steve Kirsch. The company was responsible for bringing the first mouse to the IBM PC.

== History ==
Mouse Systems' optical mouse, wired to a Sun workstation and an Atari 400 running Missile Command, attracted many observers at the October, 1982 Mini/Micro '82 conference in Anaheim, California, attended by over 10000 people—and won a "best new product" award.

In 1984, MSC acquired rights to Mouse Draw from Microtex Industries, written by Doug Wolfgram. Mouse Systems wanted the software re-developed to look more like Apple's MacPaint so Wolfgram brought in co-developer John Bridges and together they re-wrote the program in C with an updated user interface and called it PCPaint. Millions of copies were shipped, primarily bundled with all their mice until 1987.

KYE Systems, producer of the Genius brand of mice, acquired Mouse Systems in 1990.

== Technical details ==
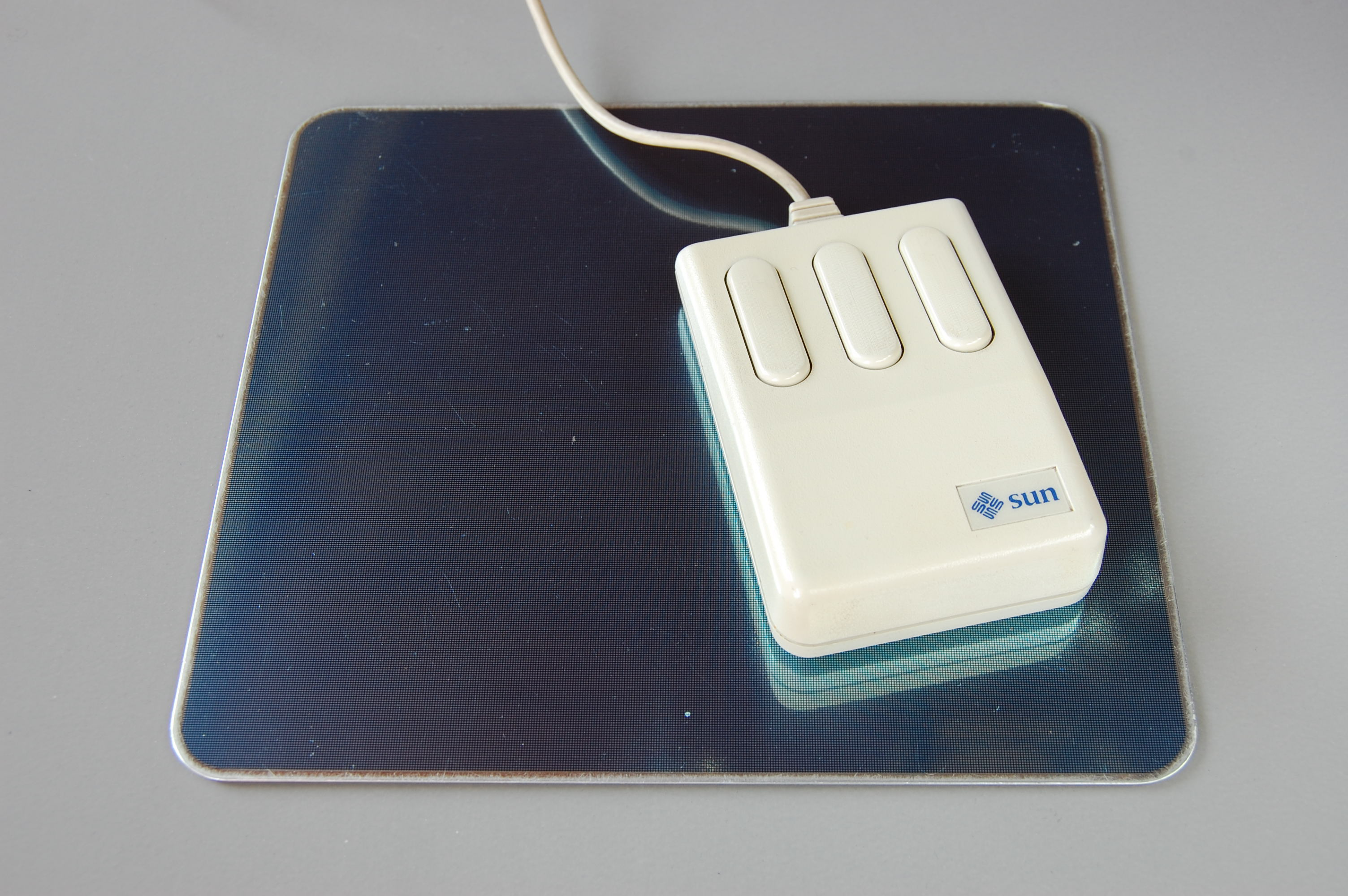
Mouse from a Sun workstation manufactured by Mouse Systems on its mousepad

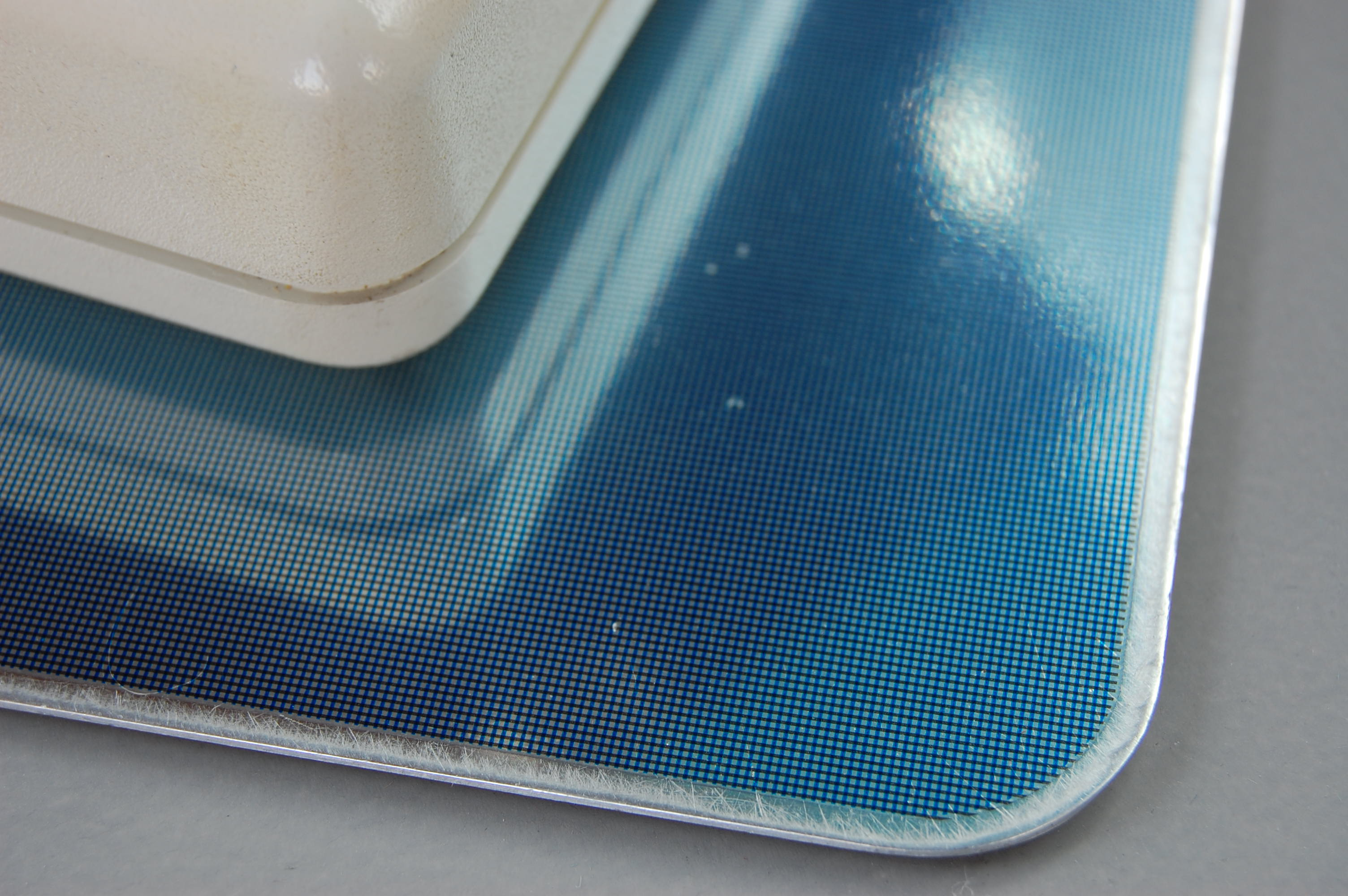
Grid detail of mousepad

Like all early optical mice, their debut product relied on a special metallic and reflective mousepad printed with a square grid of grey and blue tracking lines: as the device moved over the pad, light emitted by an LED was reflected by the pad onto an array of sensors whose output was processed by an on-board controller, which in turn supplied the host computer with machine-readable tracking data via an RS-232 serial port. When connected to a regular RS-232 port, an external power supply was required. Some mice would derive their power supply from the keyboard connector on the motherboard and came with a pass-through connector to be inserted before the keyboard cable.

Early Sun workstations used MSC optical mice exclusively. The mouse was connected via a dedicated connector with power, obviating the need for a separate power supply for the mouse. Initial models came with large mousepads with well-spaced lines, while later models were smaller and used a much tighter grid.

== See also ==
- Mouse Systems ProAgio
- Optical mouse
