= ES File Explorer =

File manager/explorer designed by ES Global

- Original author: ES Global
- Developers: ES Global (subsidiary of DO Global, a subsidiary of Baidu)
- Stable release: 4.4.3.2 / 10 July 2025
- Operating system: Android
- Platform: Android
- Size: 50 MB
- Type: File manager
- Website: www.estrongs.com

ES File Explorer is a file manager/explorer designed by ES Global, a subsidiary of DO Global, for Android devices. It includes features like cloud storage integration, file transfer from Android to Windows via FTP or LAN, and a root browser. It was removed from the Google Play Store for committing click fraud, spyware, adware, bloatware, and background processes.

== History ==
=== Popularization and functionality ===
In the early 2010s, ES File Explorer was equipped with then extraordinary features well beyond that of vendors' pre-installed file managers, which popularized the application before it developed into adware.

The functionality included range selection, tabbed browsing, bookmarking directories, ability to create home screen shortcuts to items (files and folders), ability to create new blank files, three viewing modes for items (grid, basic list, and detailed list), where detailed list previews modification dates, file sizes, and listed folders' file counts; three on-display size levels for items; file transfers in background, FTP server hosting, network protocol client (ability to connect to other FTP, WebDav and SMB servers), Bluetooth file sharing, ability to manually select an application to open a file with, (Note: Applications can be selected from the Text, Audio, Video, Photo and Other categories, where Other is a list of all user-accessible ones.) ability to automatically rename files during transfer in case of a file name conflict (Note: Given options to handle file name conflicts: Overwrite target file, renaming the source file in target directory and skipping the source file. An additional check box allows repeating the selected action for all remaining files.) and merge directories, detailed statistics during file transfer, (Note: Information displayed: Name of source and target paths, current file, current transfer rate (speed), time elapsed, estimated time remaining, progress of each file and overall progress (bar, percentage, and processed and total file counts).) a built-in text editor with UTF-8 support, media player interface (video player and music player with playback controls (Note: These playback controls include shuffle playback and repeat one/all) and playlisting), image viewer and gallery browser, download manager, drag and drop support, bulk file renaming (adding prefix, changing extension and numbering), disk usage analysis, ZIP archive file creation and browsing, recycle bin (like Microsoft Windows Explorer) and the ability to define touch pattern shortcuts (gestures), ability to filter searches by date, size range, category (photo, audio, video, APK, and documents), and file type, ability to select multiple files from search results, ability to navigate to files' parent directory from search results, generation of MD5 and SHA-1 hash sums from files, ability to copy the full path of a selected file or folder into the clipboard, quick navigation history (list of recently opened files and directories), ability to install custom themes, ability to redirect shareable content into a file, (Note: This is done through an option integrated into the Android sharing menu.) and the ability to list installed apps and to back them up as Android application package (APK) files. A detail window which shows the total separate count of files and folders within a directory and their total size as both human-readable value and byte count to allow for an exact size verification after copying files. Since a 2015 version, files can be encrypted in a proprietary format named ES lock.

=== Range selection ===
Another early feature to allow the selection of many files and folders without the need to tap on each file individually was range selection, where only two items need to be highlighted to select all listed items in between.

It resembles the shift key selection of multiple items from desktop file managers such as Windows Explorer and the Nemo file manager.

=== Lock screen hijacking ===
Around May 2016, ES File Explorer began incorporating DU Charge Booster into the app, hijacking the user's lockscreen. Several news and blog websites such as AndroidPIT, which had once recommended the app, encouraged users to uninstall it. It was removed later after much criticism and many bad reviews.

=== Fire TV App Store removal ===
ES File Explorer was accidentally removed from the Amazon Fire TV App Store in August 2016.

=== Conversion into shareware ===
Though ES File Explorer had originally been a freeware program, the app later converted into shareware. It began charging a monthly $9.99 fee in order to use its more advanced features, towards the end of 2019.

=== Controversy and removal from Play Store ===
ES File Explorer was removed from the Google Play Store in April 2019, along with several other apps created by DO Global (formerly DU Group). It was reported by BuzzFeed News.

It was claimed the company who owns ES File Explorer, DO Global, was committing 'click fraud' by clicking ads in users' apps in the background without permission. DO Global responded to these claims with the following:

“In the past week, we have noticed a series of reports about our apps by the media. We fully understand the seriousness of the allegations. As such, we immediately conducted an internal investigation on this matter. We regret to find irregularities in some of our products’ use of AdMob advertisements. Given this, we fully understand and accept Google's decision. Moreover, we have actively cooperated with them by doing a thorough examination of every app involved.

We would like to thank the media, our partners, and the public for their support. Moving forward, we will strictly follow relevant regulations and continue conducting a comprehensive review of our products. Lastly, during this process, we have caused misunderstandings and great concern due to our being unable to communicate in a timely manner and provide complete information. We offer our sincere apologies.”

It is unclear if or when ES File Explorer will return to the Google Play Store.

=== Ban in India ===
In June 2020, the Government of India banned ES File Explorer along with 58 other Chinese origin apps citing data and privacy issues.

== See also ==
- Files Go
