= Pink Rabbit (restaurant) =

Defunct bar and restaurant in Portland, Oregon, U.S.

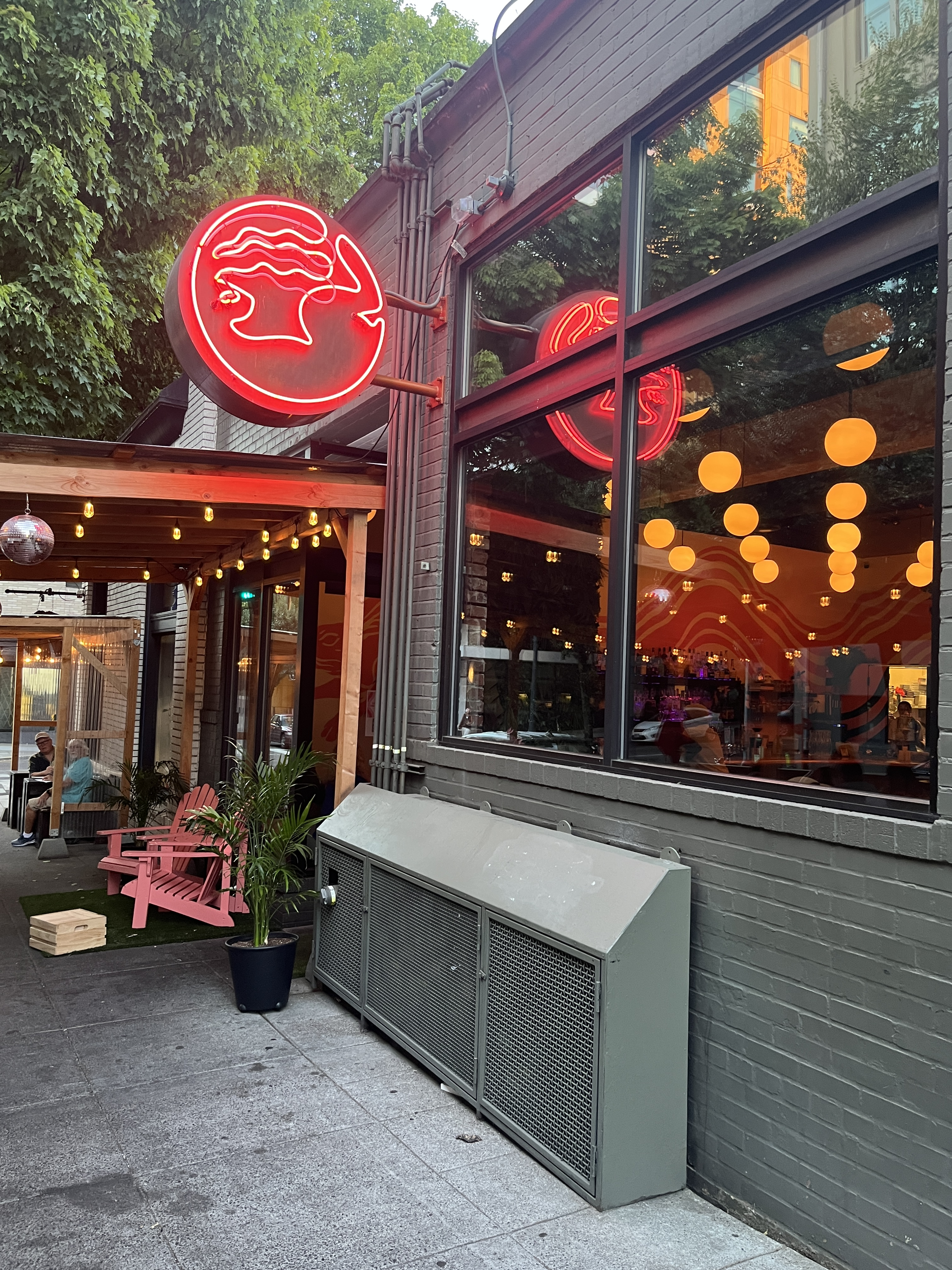
- The bar's exterior, 2022
- Interactive map of Pink Rabbit

Restaurant information
- Established: January 2019
- Location: 232 Northwest 12th Avenue, Portland, Multnomah, Oregon, 97209, United States
- Coordinates: 45.5249°N 122.6830°W
- Website: pinkrabbitbar.com

Pink Rabbit was a bar and restaurant in Portland, Oregon, United States. It began operating in northwest Portland's Pearl District in January 2019 and closed permanently in July 2026.

== Description ==
The bar and restaurant Pink Rabbit operated on 12th Avenue in northwest Portland's Pearl District. The business was named for the song "Pink Rabbits" by American indie rock band The National. The 1980's-inspired interior was blue and pink. Eater Portland described the space as "neon-lit" and "stylish". According to Portland Monthly, there was a painting of a pink rabbit by The National frontman Matt Berninger. There was also a neon sign that said, "Employees Must Wash Hands". The Portland Mercury said, "the whole place [was] designed within an inch of its flashy, gorgeous life to resemble a bar so perfectly unlikely that it seem[ed] custom-built to further the plot in some postmodern novel". Pink Rabbit had picnic tables outside. In 2021, the curbside patio had live plants, mirror balls, rope lights, and speakers.

=== Menu ===
The menu included Southeast Asian options such as a Thai-style braised oxtail burger with som tom papaya coleslaw and fried shallots, as well as arancini balls stuffed with braised octopus or mozzarella. Other Asian and Asian-influenced options included banh mi hot dogs, chow mein, and fried rice with kimchi. The food menu also included deviled eggs with pink pickles, gorgonzola fondue fries, nachos with ahi, pastas such as garlic gochujang noodles, and many gluten-free options.

Many cocktails were named after lyrics by The National, though there were also drinks named after songs by Fiona Apple and Nirvana. Among drinks was the Internet Famous, which had vodka, guava and oolong tea, and egg whites. The Quiet Company had mezcal and the Sucker's Luck had gin and sherry. The Rosy Minded Fuzz, which was also named after a song by The National, had Floral Hendrick's Gin, soda, egg whites, grapefruit, orgeat syrup, rose water, and cream. The What Did Harvard Teach You had scotch whisky, honey, lemon, ginger and sparkling lambrusco. There were also frozen drinks and a drink with CBD.

== History ==
Billy Hasson and Tyler Stevens opened Pink Rabbit in January 2019, in the space that previously housed Hamlet.

Collin Nicholas became the owner and operator in 2021.

Alex Wong was Pink Rabbit's chef in 2022. Pink Rabbit had a "sibling" bar called Dirty Pretty.

In July 2026, Pink Rabbit announced plans to close permanently.

== Reception ==
Portland Monthly included Pink Rabbit in a 2020 overview of the city's best new bars. In 2023, Willamette Week said of the bar: "The lighting, decor, and potentially-overdone pink neon sign combination somehow avoids being overly trendy, and is instead quite tasteful and chic. In our opinion, Pink Rabbit's happy hour is the perfect place for a Hinge date—aka it's a little noisy and dimly lit, so as to drown out some first-date awkwardness. But, it's also perfectly pink and Instagram-able for a Wednesday night out with friends." Rebecca Roland included Pink Rabbit in Eater Portland's 2025 overview of the city's best cocktail bars. The website also included the bar in a 2025 list of the best eateries in the Pearl District.

== See also ==
- List of defunct restaurants of the United States
