= Solar Garden Lights =

Outdoor illumination of gardens powered by solar panels

Solar garden lights serve as a decorative element in outdoor and garden settings. In some cases, solar lights might be more practical than traditional incandescent bulbs. They often are simple to set up and can be installed by laypeople.

Solar lights may be found on the market in a variety of shapes, sizes, types, designs, and features to meet the needs and preferences of each consumer. Solar-powered landscape lighting does not require extra wiring or an electrical connection because it is fueled by the sun. This makes landscape lighting conceivable in remote areas of the garden where electrical wire is not easily accessible, in addition to being straightforward for installation.

The lights come in various shapes and designs, and some are designed to mimic candles, some have RGB color changing LEDs. They often have a spike at the bottom for easy installation into the ground.

== Components ==
The solar photovoltaic (PV) panel, rechargeable battery, control electronics, and light fixture are the four basic components of solar lighting. As the sun shines, a solar panel converts the light into electrical energy and charges the internal battery. When darkness begins and the panel stops generating electricity, a chip inside the fixture turns on the LED. The common battery type inside these lamps is NiMH, some others use Lithium-ion batteries. The NiMH batteries often are the standard AAA type, or button cells.

== Average run time ==
Solar lights have an average run time of between six and ten hours each night and may remain operational for anywhere between two and five years. It is possible to increase the amount of time your solar lights will continue to function if you bring them inside during the winter.
