= Point and click =

Computer technique

Point and click are one of the actions of a computer user moving a pointer to a certain location on a screen (pointing) and then pressing a button on a mouse or other pointing device (clicking). An example of point and click is in hypermedia, where users click on hyperlinks to navigate from document to document. User interfaces, for example graphical user interfaces, are sometimes described as "point-and-click interfaces", often to suggest that they are very easy to use, requiring that the user simply point to indicate their wishes. Describing software this way implies that the interface can be controlled solely through a pointing device, with minimal or no input from the keyboard, as with many graphical user interfaces.

A web browser tooltip displayed for a hyperlink

In some systems, such as Internet Explorer, moving the pointer over a link (or other GUI control) and waiting for a split-second will cause a tooltip to be displayed.

== Single click ==
A single click or "click" is the act of pressing a computer mouse button once without moving the mouse. Single clicking is usually a primary action of the mouse. Single clicking, by default in many operating systems, selects (or highlights) an object while double-clicking executes or opens the object. The single-click has many advantages over double click due to the reduced time needed to complete the action. The single-click or one-click phrase has also been used to apply to the commercial field as a competitive advantage. The slogan "single click" or "one-click" commonly advertises services' ease of use.

=== On icons ===
By default on most computer systems, for a person to select a certain software function, they will have to click on the left button. An example of this can be a person clicking on an icon. Similarly, clicking on the right button will present the user with a text menu to select more actions. These actions can range from open, explore, properties, etc. In terms of entertainment software, point-and-click interfaces are common input methods, usually offering a 'menu' or 'icon bar' interface that functions expectedly. In other games, the character explores different areas within the game world. To move to another area, the player will move the cursor to one point of the screen, where the cursor will turn into an arrow. Clicking will then move the player to that area.

=== On text ===
In many text processing programs, such as web browsers or word processors, clicking on text moves the cursor to that location. Clicking and holding the left button allows users to highlight the selected text. This enables more options to edit or use the text.

== Double click ==
A double click is most commonly used with a computer mouse when the pointer is placed over an icon or object and the button is quickly pressed twice without moving the mouse.

== Fitts's Law ==
Fitts's law can be used to quantify the time required to perform a point-and-click action.

$T = a + b \log_2 \Bigg(1+\frac{D}{W}\Bigg)$ where:

- $T$ is the average time taken to complete a single movement.
- $a$ represents the start/stop time of the device and $b$ stands for the inherent speed of the device. These constants can be determined experimentally by fitting a straight line to measured data.
- $D$ is the distance from the starting point to the center of the target.
- $W$ is the width of the target measured along the axis of motion. $W$ can also be thought of as the allowed error tolerance in the final position since the final point of the motion must fall within $\pm\frac{W}{2}$ of the target's centre.

== See also ==
- Double-click
- Triple-click
- Mouse chording
- Drag and drop
- Graphical user interface
- Mystery meat navigation#"Click here"
- 1-Click (one-click buying)
- Point-and-click adventure game
