= Lake Theater & Cafe =

Movie theater and restaurant in Lake Oswego, Oregon, U.S.

- Interactive map of Lake Theater & Cafe
- Address: Lake Oswego, Oregon; United States
- Coordinates: 45.4164°N 122.6639°W

Lake Theater & Cafe is a movie theater and pub in Lake Oswego, Oregon, United States. It has garnered attention for its marquee messages. In 2026, one message said, "To defeat your enemy, you must know them. Melania starts Friday." Another message said, " Wouldn’t it be great if Michael Jackson hadn’t groomed boys? Come see Devil Wears Prada 2 instead!" A third message in 2026, which garnered criticism for its antisemitic undertones, said: "Before there were the Jews, there was…The Odyssey." The owner refused to apologize for the marquee message, instead doubling down on his decision and claiming that antisemitism is "exaggerated".
