= Double-click =

Computer input action

A double-click is the act of pressing a computer mouse button twice quickly without moving the mouse. Double-clicking allows two different actions to be associated with the same mouse button. It was developed by Tim Mott of Xerox Palo Alto Research Center. Often, single-clicking selects (or highlights) an object (e.g. the space between two characters) while a double-click selects the next object up in the selection hierarchy (e.g. a word), or executes the function associated with that object (e.g. open a file folder). Following a link in a modern web browser is accomplished with only a single click, requiring the use of a second mouse button, "click and hold" delay, or modifier key to gain access to actions other than following the link. On touchscreens, the double-click is called "double-tap"; it's not used as much as double-click, but typically it functions as a zoom feature. ("triple-tap" sometimes used to zoom the whole screen.)

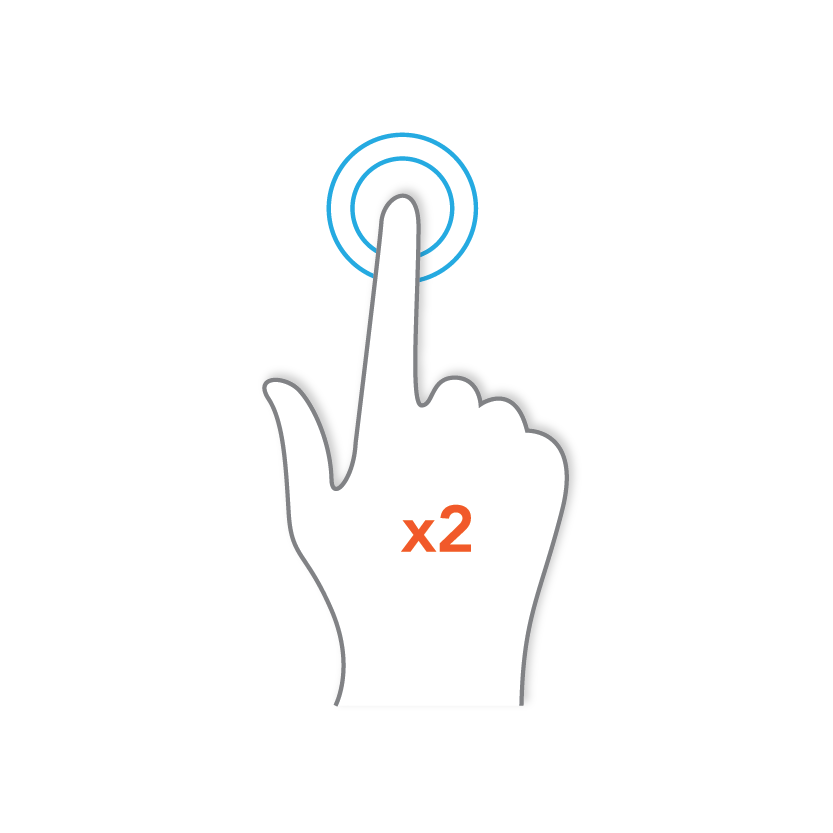
double-click

== On icons ==
On most systems, double-clicking an icon in the file manager will perform a default action on the object represented by the icon. Double-clicking an application program will launch the program, and double-clicking a file icon will open the file in a default application for that file's type or format.

== On text ==
In many programs, double-clicking on text selects an entire word, and possibly other characters, as defined in word boundaries. (In X Window, it will also copy that piece of text into a buffer separate from the system clipboard, as with all selected text. The selected text is not also put into clipboard until an overt cut or copy action takes place. A person can retrieve the information from this buffer, which is not the system clipboard, later by pressing the middle mouse button.)

== Difficulties ==
New mouse users or the elderly often have difficulty with double-clicking due to a need for specific fine motor skills. They may have trouble clicking fast enough or keeping the mouse still while double-clicking.

Solutions to this may include:

- Click once to select and press Enter on keyboard (on Windows systems).
- Using keyboard navigation instead of a mouse.
- Configuring the system to use single clicks for actions usually associated with double-clicks.
- Configuring the system to allow for more delay time between the two clicks for it to be registered as a double-click (See below for how to on several operating systems)
- Remapping the double-click function to a single click on an additional button, for example the often unused middle button. This effectively creates a Unix style 3-button scheme of select/action/context.
- To prevent the mouse from moving during a double-click, bracing the mouse by putting the thumb on the side of the mouse and the bottom of the hand on the bottom of the mouse.
- In Windows, the threshold of movement can be increased by changing the associated registry keys in HKEY_CURRENT_USER\Control Panel\Mouse

Additionally, applications and operating systems will often not require the mouse to be completely still. Instead, they implement hysteresis, allowing for a small amount of movement between the two clicks.

Another complication lies in the fact that some systems associate one action with a single click, another with a double-click, and yet another with a two consecutive single clicks. Even advanced users sometimes fail to differentiate between these properly. An example is the most common way of renaming a file in Microsoft Windows. A single click highlights the file's icon and another single click (on the filename, not the icon) makes the name of the file editable. A user who tries to execute this action may inadvertently open the file (a double-click) by clicking too quickly, while a user who tries to open the file may find it being renamed by clicking too slowly. This may be avoided by Windows' users by using the menu (or F2/↵ Enter) to initiate renaming and opening rather than multiple clicks. In GNOME, this problem is avoided entirely by simply not allowing file renaming by this method. In the classic Mac OS, which originated this technique, moving the mouse after the first click would immediately highlight the name. This was the result of a bug in the first versions of the system, one that was deliberately continued after users had come to rely upon it.

== Speed and timing ==
The maximum delay required for two consecutive clicks to be interpreted as a double-click is not standardized. According to Microsoft's MSDN website, the default timing in Windows is 500 ms (half a second). The double-click time is also used as a basis for other timed actions.

The double-click timing delay can usually be configured by the user. For example, adjusting double-click settings can be done by:

- Windows XP, Windows Vista and Windows 7 - Start > Control Panel > Mouse > Buttons (Start > Control Panel > Printers & Other Hardware > Mouse > Buttons if Control Panel is in Category view). If you prefer, you may use Start > Run > main.cpl.
- macOS - Applications (or Apple menu) > System Preferences > Keyboard & Mouse > Mouse
- In the KDE Desktop under Unix-like operating systems - K Menu > Control Center (or Alt+F2 "kcontrol") > Peripherals > Mouse > Advanced > Double-click interval
- In the GNOME Desktop under Unix-like operating systems - System > Preferences > Mouse

== Patent ==
In 2004, Microsoft was granted a patent on using a double-click on "limited resource computing devices". As a result of this, some observers feared that any U.S. company which uses double-clicking may have to change their product not to use the technology, pay licensing fees to Microsoft, or give Microsoft access to intellectual property. The patent expired in 2019.

== See also ==
- Single-click
- Triple-click
