= Simultaneous editing =

Text editing technique allowing editing multiple locations simultaneously

A screencast demonstration of simultaneous editing using the multiple selection feature of Sublime Text v3.

In human–computer interaction, simultaneous editing is an text editing technique allowing a single user to make multiple simultaneous edits in a multiple selection at once through direct manipulation.

Multiple selections and cursors are typically created by using a keyboard shortcut to select repeated instances of the same text or text fragments surrounded by the same delimiters, by using a search feature to select all instances of a search term, by selecting the same column in multiple lines, or by selecting text or cursor positions with a mouse. The Lapis experimental web browser and text editor is also able to infer selections based on concept learning from positive and negative examples given by the user during a process known as selection guessing.

Tools for data wrangling (mass reformatting) also sometimes include commands for simultaneous editing of all data in a column or category.

== Editors supporting simultaneous editing ==
- Simultaneous editing in Lapis
- Multiple selections in Sublime Text
- Multiple cursors in Cloud9
- Multi-cursor package in Atom
- Multiple selections in Visual Studio Code
- Multiple selections in Firefox developer tools
- Multiple-cursors in Emacs
- Multi Edit plug-in for gedit
- Multi-Editing Settings in Notepad++
- Multiple carets in PyCharm
- Column Edit Mode in Vi and Vi derivatives such as Vim

== See also ==
- Batch renaming
