= Advanced Renamer =

Batch renamer program

Batch rename utility

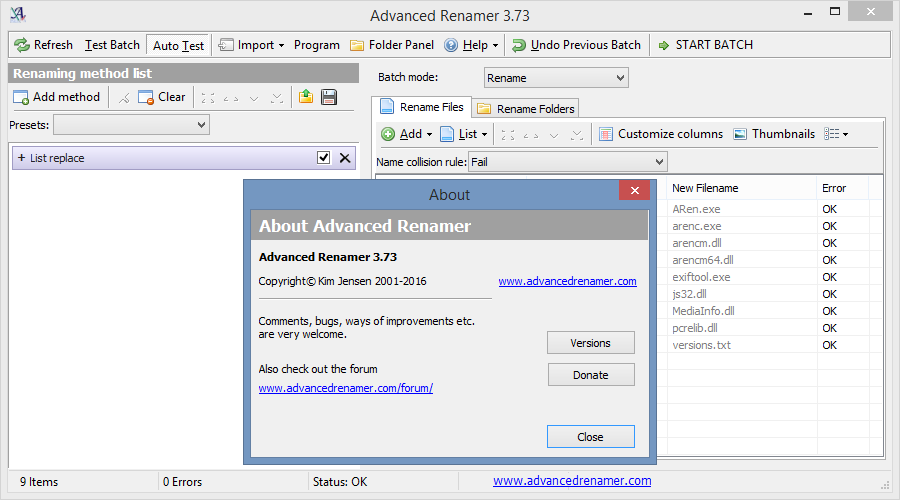
- Advanced Renamer v3.73 Portable running on Windows 8.1
- Developer: Kim Jensen
- Stable release: 4.28 / 27 October 2026; 10 days ago
- Operating system: Windows 10 and later, macOS
- Size: Windows: 12,39 MB
- Available in: 25 languages
- List of languages English, Arabic, Bulgarian, Catalan, Czech, Danish, German, Spanish, Finnish, French, Indonesian, Italian, Japanese, Korean, Norwegian (Bokmal), Dutch, Polish, Portuguese (Brazil), Romanian, Slovenian, Turkish, Ukrainian, Vietnamese, Chinese, Chinese (Traditional)
- Type: Batch renaming
- License: Freeware
- Website: www.advancedrenamer.com

Advanced Renamer is a batch renamer program that can rename multiple files and folders at once. It is developed for Microsoft Windows and released as freeware.

== Features ==
- Real-time preview
- Thumbnail view for pictures
- Multi-panel design
- Renaming methods such as: remove pattern, renumber, replace, add, list, trim, new name and case, attributes and timestamp.

== Language support ==
Advanced Renamer supports 25 languages: English, Arabic, Bulgarian, Catalan, Czech, Danish, German, Spanish, Finnish, French, Indonesian, Italian, Japanese, Korean, Norwegian (Bokmal), Dutch, Polish, Portuguese (Brazil), Romanian, Slovenian, Turkish, Ukrainian, Vietnamese, Chinese, Chinese (Traditional).

== Popularity ==
As of July 2014, the program has been downloaded over 26,000 times from CNET alone.

== Reception ==
In a 2010 review, CNET called Advanced Renamer a "great tool" and mentioned "It's hard to imagine what the average user would need in the way of a renamer that it doesn't have." CNET gave the software 4.5 out of 5 stars, with an average user rating of 4 out of 5 stars.

Amber Sass from Softonic praised the flexibility, by calling it "Very flexible in renaming options". She also noted the preview feature as a pro, but criticized the usability for new users by calling it "Complicated to figure out at first". Overall, Advanced Renamer was given a rating of 9/10.
