= Rope light =

Decorative lighting fixture

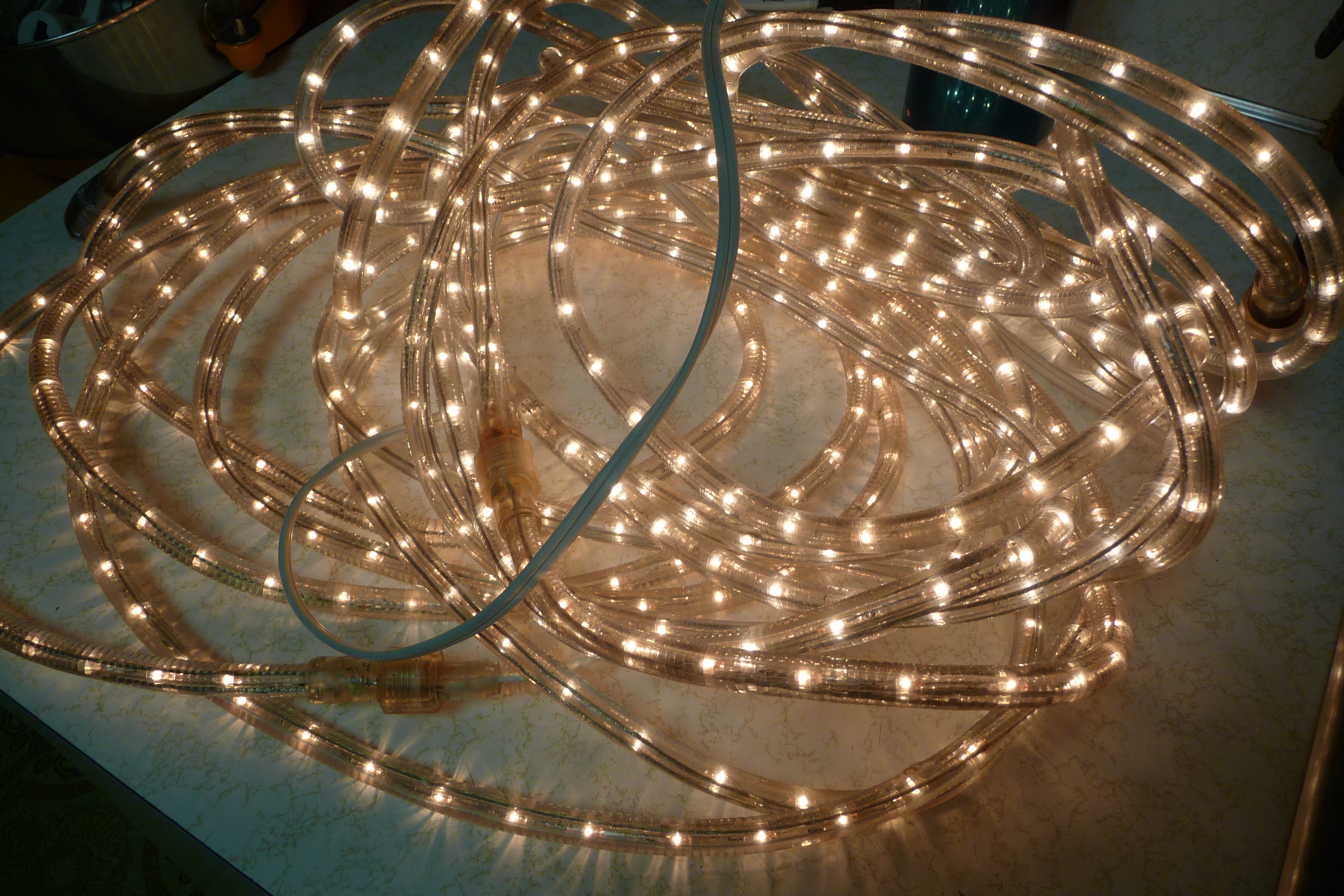
A length of illuminated rope light

A rope light is primarily used as a decorative lighting fixture, featuring small lights linked together and encased in a PVC jacket to create a string of lights. Rope lights can be used in many applications both indoors and outdoors. Used in place of neon signs, it is sometimes called soft neon.

== Design ==
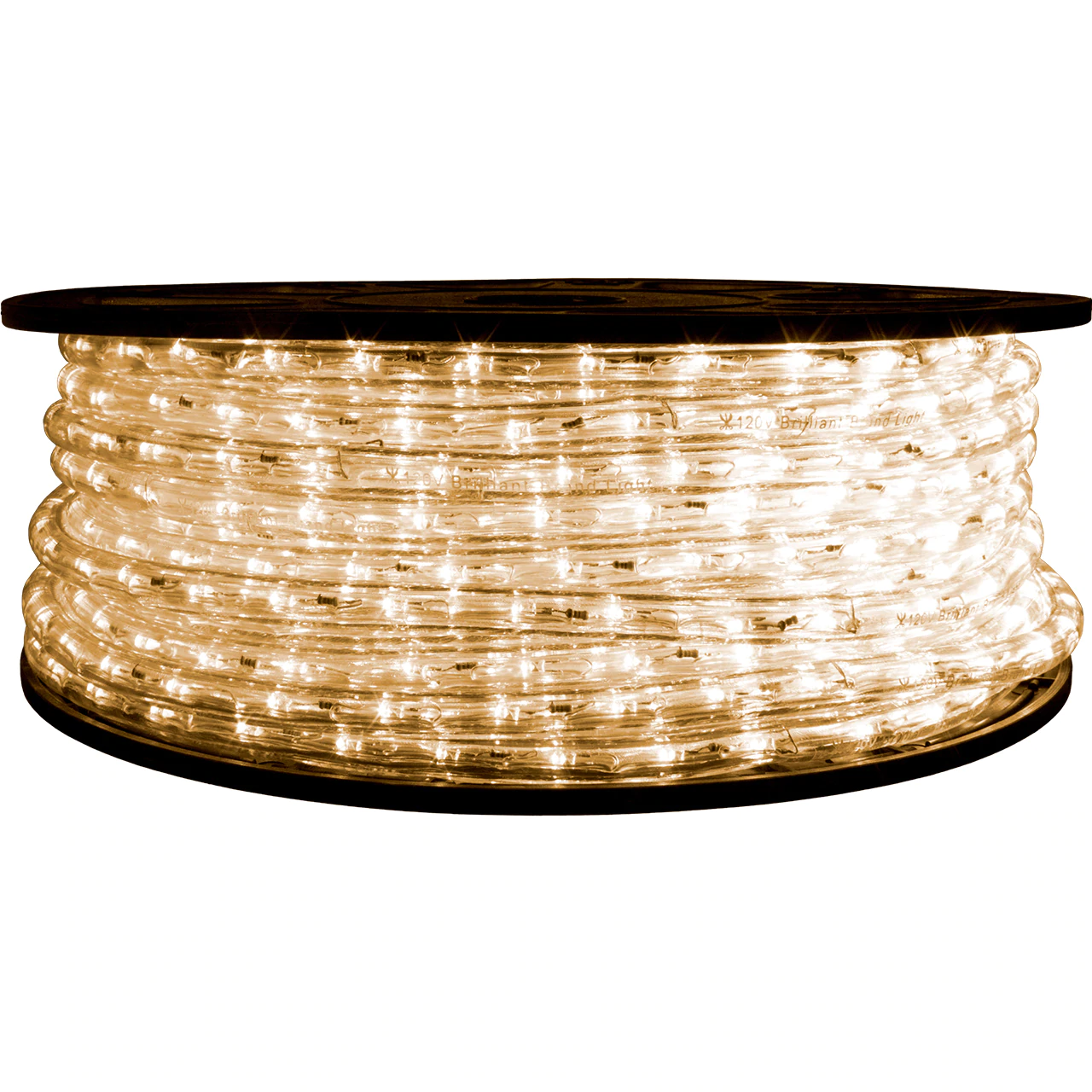
Warm white LED rope light on the spool

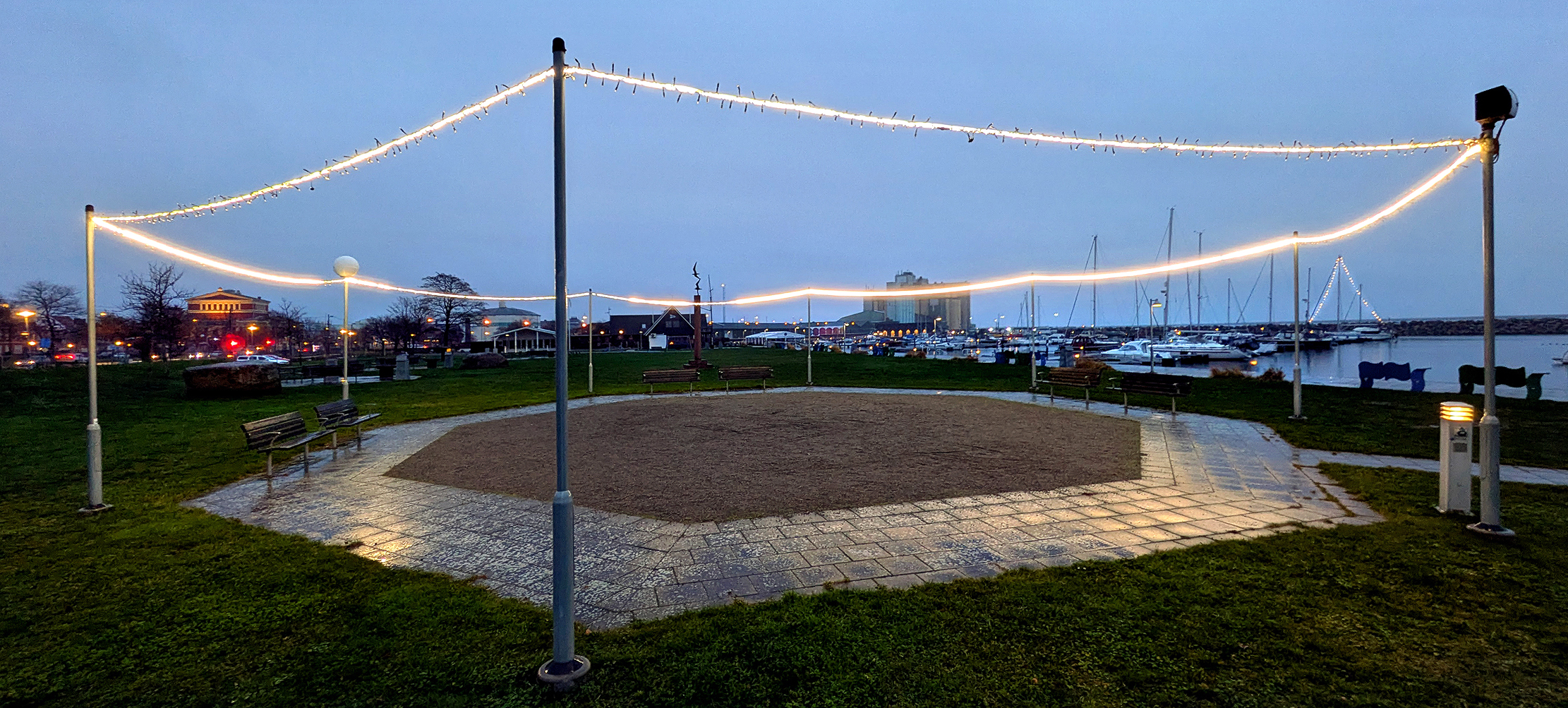
Rope light at a public gathering place in Ystad's marina.

The design of a rope light generally depends on the end use of the product.

The basic design involves stringing together bulbs on a wire and then encasing the wire in a clear plastic jacket. The number of wires depends on the functionality required of the rope light. A basic rope light has two wires, which generally allows users to make bulbs dim or flash. However, a rope light with three wires allows greater functionality including chasing, dimming and flashing.

The outer plastic tube is also an important feature that greatly affects the end use of any rope light. A rope light with relatively wider plastic tubing is more durable to external elements but less flexible. Thinner plastic tubing, on the other hand, is far more flexible but less robust. Generally, rope lights for heavy use outdoors feature thicker plastic casings while those used for more decorative purposes indoors have relatively thin plastic casings.

Rope lights in the United States are generally sold in three different voltages: 12 volts, 24 volts and 120 volts. Generally, the 12 volts and 24 volts variants are better suited for situations where a battery is used to power the lights. Hence, this is the best option for cars, boats, etc. The 120-volt version is more appropriate for household or industrial lighting requirements.

== LED and incandescent rope lights compared ==
LED rope lights have bulbs that are available in different colors and the bulbs themselves generate the colors. In contrast, incandescent rope lights typically have bulbs with a colored filter that is applied around the bulb. Therefore, when an LED rope light is switched off, it appears colorless, while incandescent bulbs still appear colored.

LED rope lights require far less energy than incandescent rope lights and generate comparatively less heat. LED bulbs use about 1 watt per foot in power while a traditional rope light uses close to 3 watts of light per foot. In general, LED rope lights are rated for 100,000 hours while a comparative incandescent rope light is rated for 25,000 hours.

== Applications ==
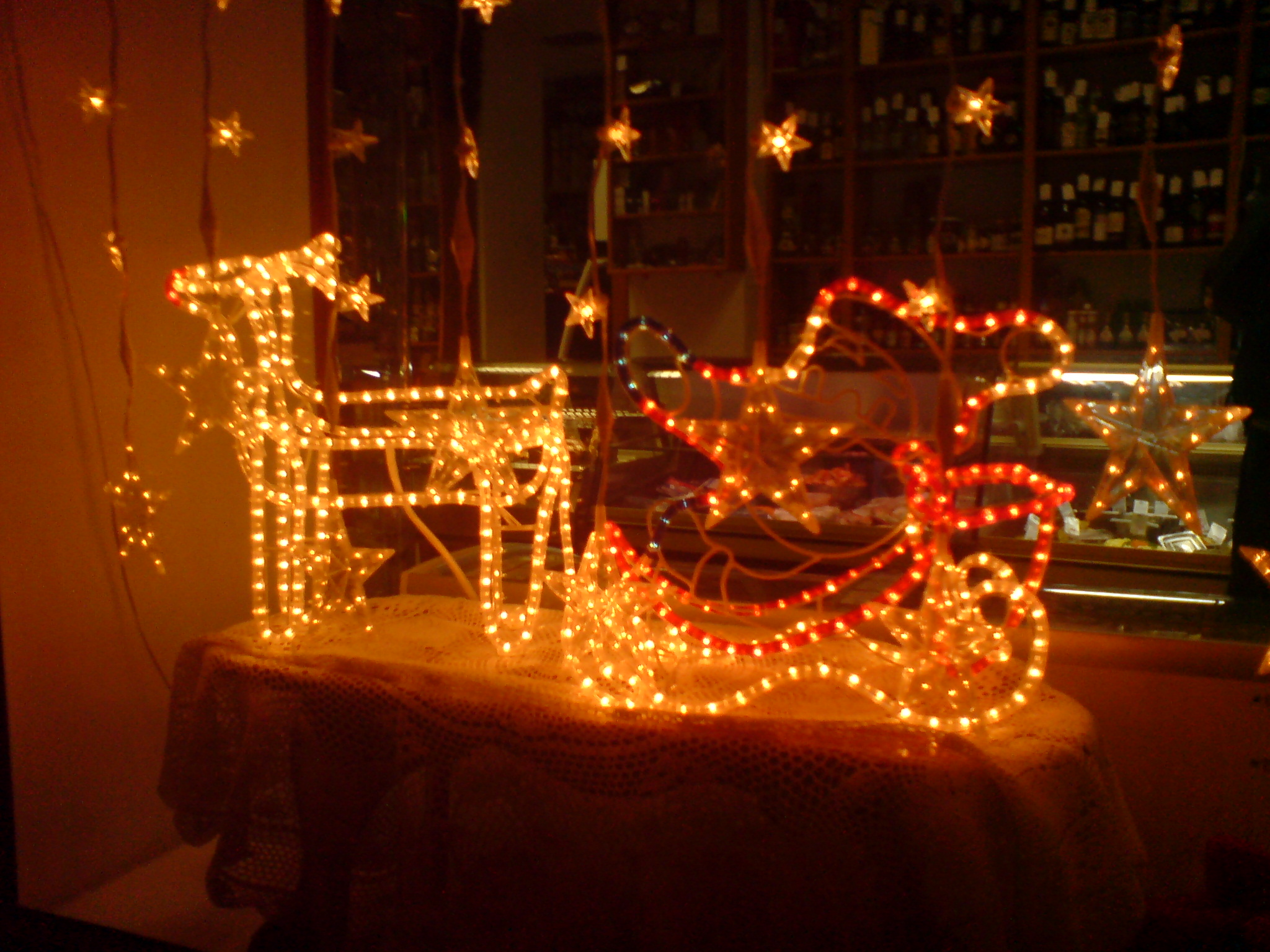
Rope light Christmas decoration

Many brands of rope lights are rated for either or both indoor and outdoor use. Due to the versatility of this lighting technology, it can be used in a variety of different environments without compromising the quality of the lighting.

Rope lights can be used for both decorative and practical indoor lighting purposes. Common indoor uses include outlining the edge of a kitchen counter or bar, comprehensive ceiling lighting and under-lighting the baseboards in a movie theater. Rope lights also suit a room with no permanent layout like a garage, attic or children's rooms, where it can provide comprehensive lighting throughout the entire room regardless of how things are arranged. Ambient lighting in rooms also may be achieved using rope lights.

Outdoor uses for rope lights include staircase lighting, outdoor patio or deck lighting and outdoor artistic displays. Rope lights are durable and suitable for use around the garden, pool, driveway, shed, etc. During holiday seasons, lights can be used to create messages or designs with different colors and patterns.
