= KRename =

Software

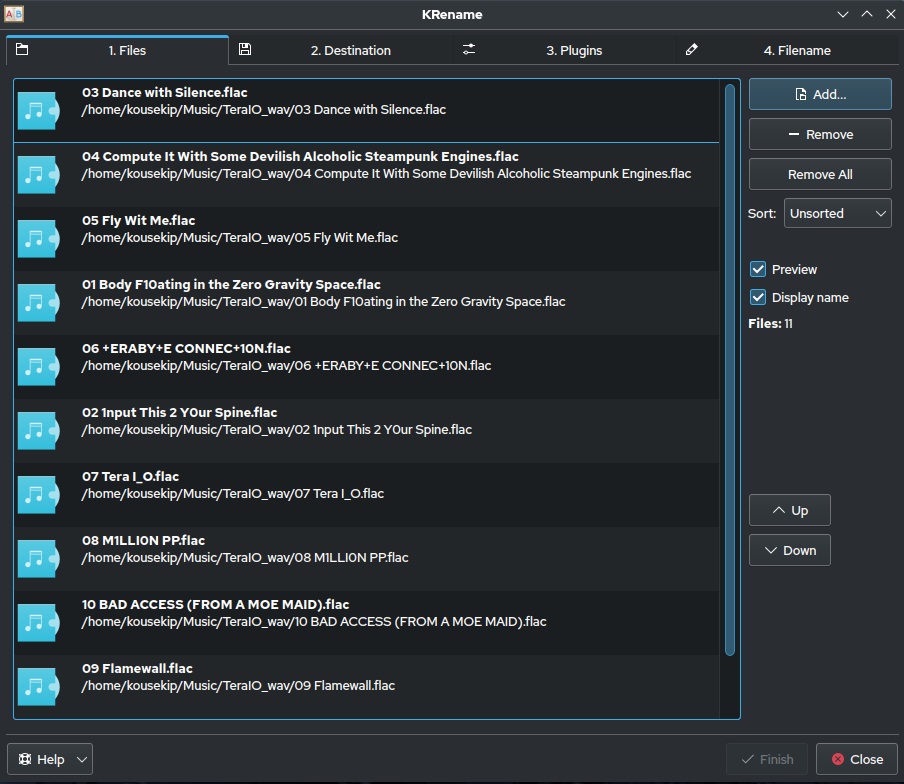
- Original author: Dominik Seichter
- Initial release: January 5, 2004
- Stable release: 5.0.1 / October 5, 2020; 5 years ago
- Repository: invent.kde.org/utilities/krename
- Written in: C++
- Operating system: Linux
- Available in: Multilingual
- Type: Batch renaming utility
- License: GPL-2.0-or-later
- Website: https://userbase.kde.org/KRename

KRename is a KDE software that can be used for renaming multiple files and directories at one time. Many Linux distributions that use Plasma as the default desktop environment include the KRename software.

== Features ==
- Rename both files and directories
- Rename all files in a directory recursively
- Ignore hidden files when renaming
- Case change: to UPPERCASE, to lowercase or to Only The First Letter
- Add prefix or postfix to filenames
- Search and replace parts of filenames (regular expressions are supported)
- Add ordered numbers to filenames (start, steps, skips definable)
- Change owner and permission of files
- Change access and modification date & time of files
- Deliver the renamed files to newly created directories (files per directory, numbering format of directories definable)
- Extract ID3 info from MP3/ogg files
- Extract Exif info from image files
- Add the current date and time to a filename
- Change file extensions
- Undo renaming
- Manual renaming of desired files
- Konqueror, Krusader, Dolphin integration
- Use JavaScript scripting
- Transliterate
