= Snap (computer graphics) =

In computer graphics, snapping allows an object to be easily positioned in alignment with grid lines, guide lines or another object, by causing it to automatically jump to an exact position when the user drags it to the proximity of the desired location.

Some CAD software provides a "Snap" pull-down menu with diverse options as preferences for the practice of the operation.

In Windows, with the "snap windows" option enabled, snapping a window against the top (or side) edge of the screen causes it to change into full screen (or half-screen for multitasking).

Software snapping is analogous to hardware detents which serve to indicate discrete values or steps of an input device.

== See also ==
- Snap rounding
