= Métamorphose (software) =

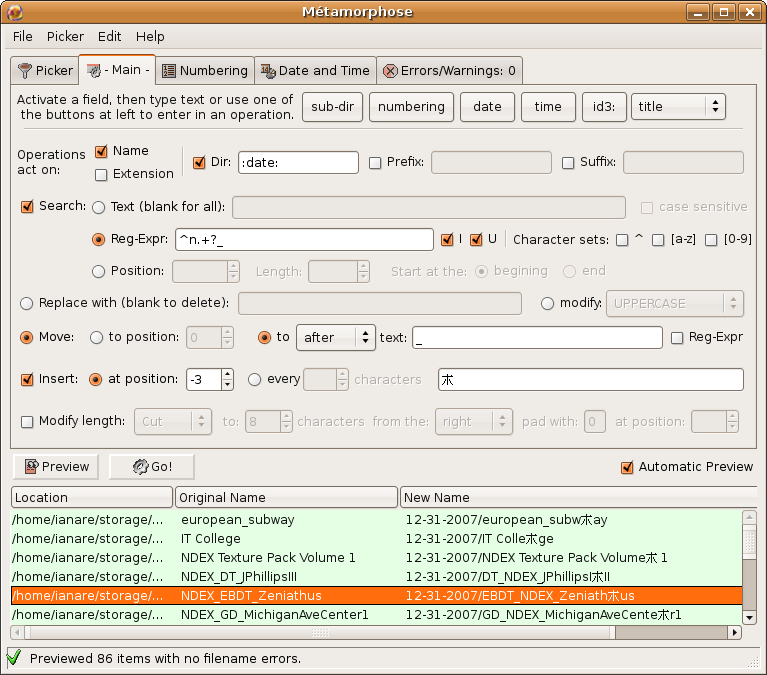
- Main panel on Ubuntu 7.04
- Stable release: 1.1.2 / November 19, 2009; 16 years ago
- Preview release: Métamorphose 2 : 2.0.8.2 / 13 June 2015; 11 years ago
- Written in: Python
- Operating system: All major operating systems
- Type: Batch renaming utility
- License: GPL v3
- Website: file-folder-ren.sourceforge.net

Métamorphose or Métamorphose file -n- folder renamer is an open source batch renamer. The focus is on legibility, usability, and power - there are no codes or formats to remember and all controls are shown, yet rather complicated operations can be done. Because it is written in wxPython, it is very portable, and can run on all major operating systems.

== Features ==
- Renames files and folders simultaneously.
- Recursive selection - loads files in directory and in subdirectories.
- Undo an operation.
- Wide use of regular expressions: when selecting items, for search/replace, etc..
- Reading of metadata such as ID3 and Exif tags, or creation/modification/last access time.
- Change length of names.
- Change case in various ways.
- Add counting sequences: numerical, alphabetical, and Roman numeral.
- Extensive multilingual and platform support (see below).

== Language and OS support ==
From the beginning, Métamorphose was conceived to be as widely usable as possible. As a result of this, there has been extensive testing and adjustments done to ensure all portions of the application are displayed and function properly across different platforms. Here are the fully tested and supported operating systems:

- Microsoft Windows, versions: 2000, XP, Vista, 7, 2003, 2008 and 2008R2 servers.
- Linux and FreeBSD: using GNOME, KDE, Blackbox, and Fluxbox.
- Mac OS X

Likewise, language choice has been important since inception. The GNU gettext system is used, allowing for easy translation of the application, and a custom help section loader will also show localised help files if they are available. There is support for properly displaying right to left languages.

Here are the currently available languages:

- Interface and all help files: US English, French, Italian
- Interface, some help files: Brazilian Portuguese, German, Hungarian, Japanese, Polish, Spanish, Turkish
- Interface only: Arabic, Chinese (Simplified), Dutch, Greek, Russian, Swedish

== Métamorphose 2 ==
With the first version now completed, work for the next stage of the project has begun. More specifically, the focus is on fixing the following shortcomings of the current version:

- User has no control of order of operations.
- Only one operation type per rename.
- Main interface can be confusing to a new user.
- No way to make 3rd party add-on modules.
- Adding more user-requested features.
