= Chase (lighting) =

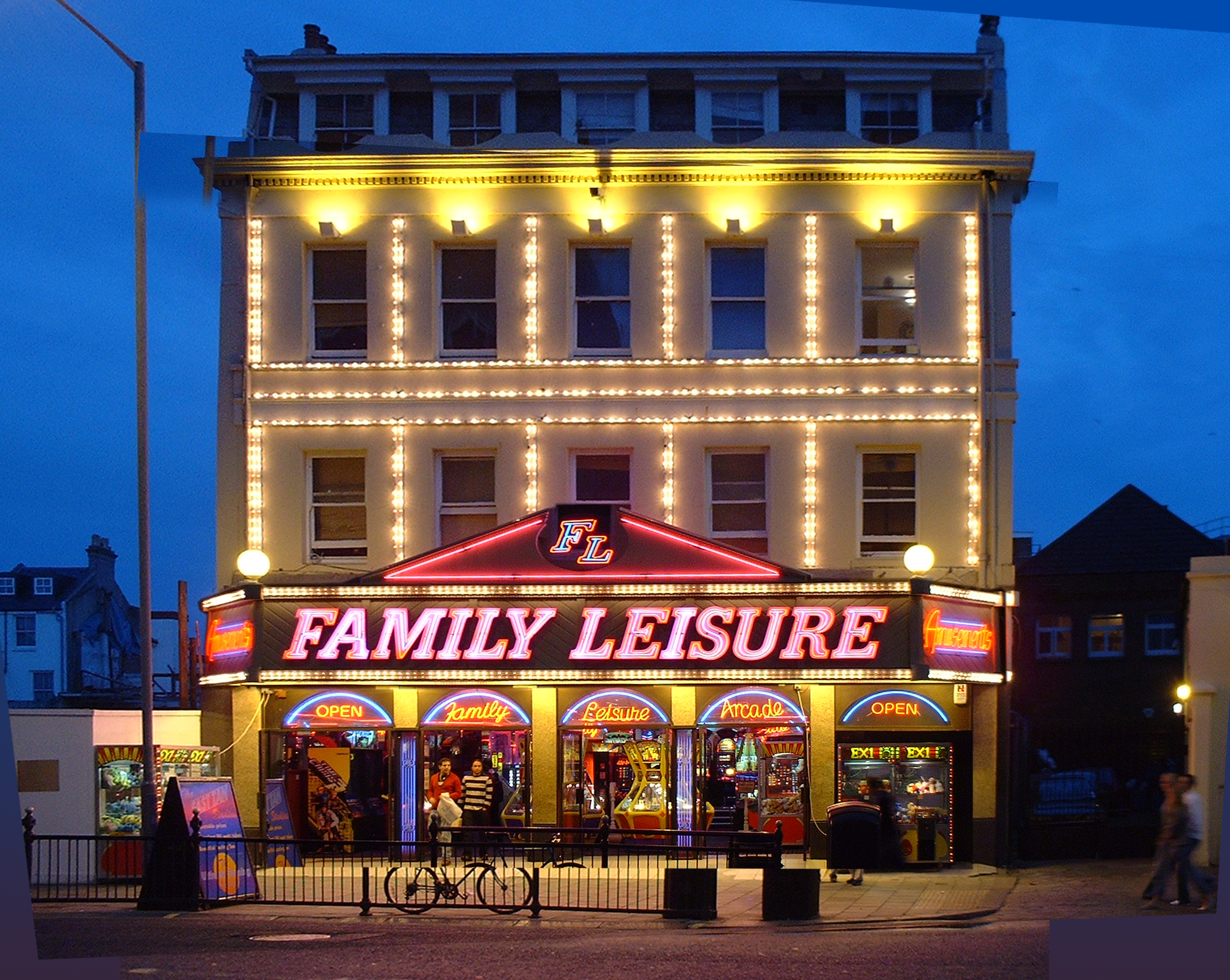
An arcade featuring extensive chaser lights

Simple LED chase lights with one-direction running pattern

LED chase lights with pattern from digital Johnson counter circuit

A chase is an electrical application where strings of adjacent light bulbs cycle on and off frequently to give the illusion of lights moving along the string. With computerized lighting consoles, building chase sequences has become easier, while previously chases used mechanical means, such as a wheel with an electrified spindle which strikes electrical contacts for each circuit.

Chase lights (or chaser lights) are often associated with the marquee signs of some movie theaters, and have also been used as a common element of television game show sets.

== Creating a chase effect ==
In order to achieve a chase "strip lights" are most often used, especially when used in "theatrical" applications.

Similar design is used in computing, where it is known as "marching ants".

Several separate circuits of lights (called channels) are needed to create a chase effect which is a simulation of motion achieved by turning these circuits ON and OFF in sequence. The standard is 3 or 4 channels. For 4 channels the lights are wired with one common and 4 different feeds. Light #1 is wired with lights #5 & 9 & 13, etc. (+4); Light #2 is wired with lights #6 & 10 & 14, etc. (+4); Light #3 is wired with lights #7 & 11 & 15, etc. (+4); Light #4 is wired with lights #8 & 12 & 16, etc. (+4).

Marquees with 12 lights grouped into 2, 3 and 4 channels (click for SMIL animation)

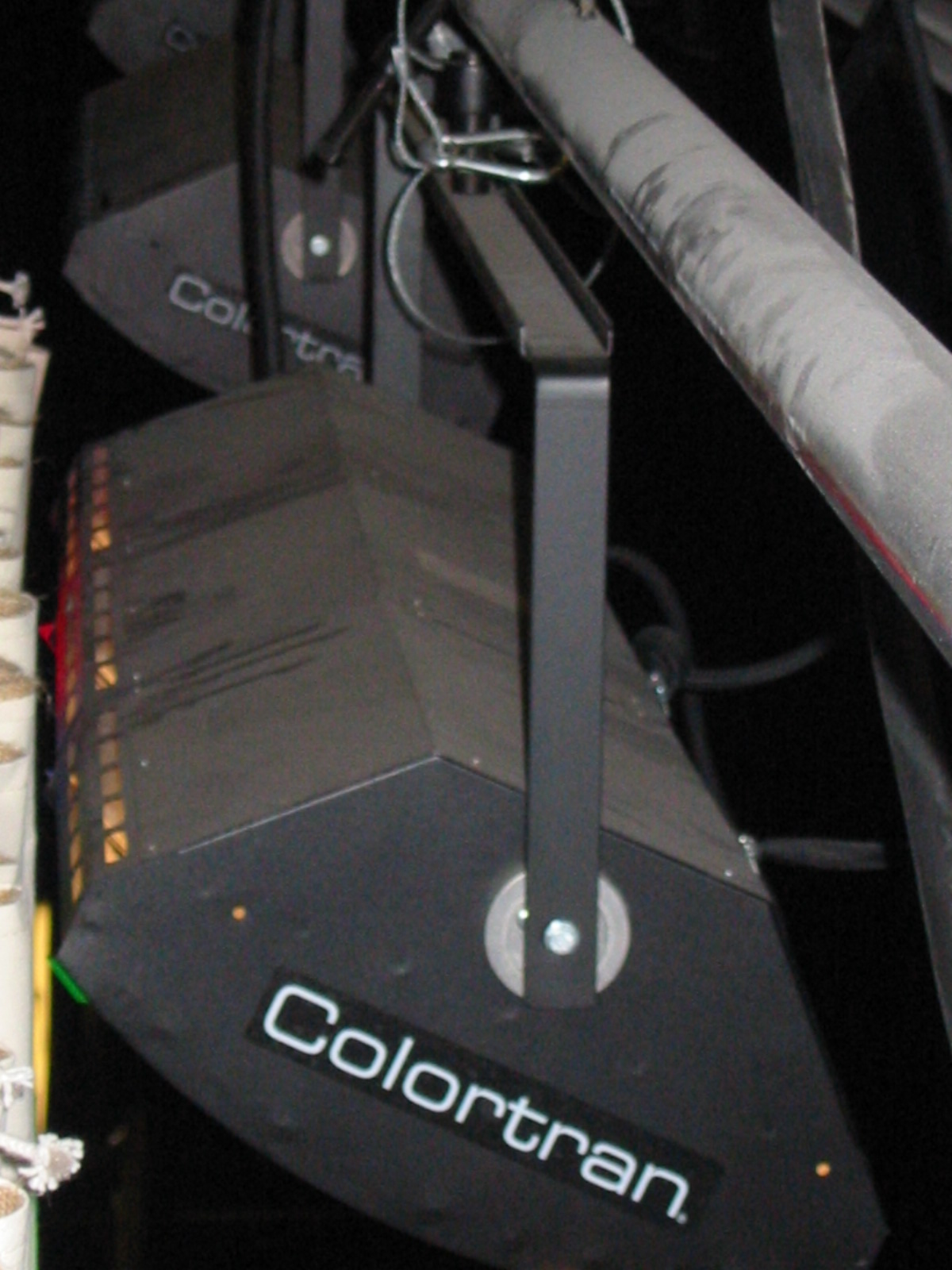
Floodlights with a chase effect, traditionally known as cyclorama lights

The most common 4 channel chase which is seen in a theater Marquee perimeter lighting and other lighting animation applications consists of 4 channel wired light bulbs and an electronic chaser. The electronic chaser turns channel #1 ON while all the other Channels remain OFF. Then after an adjustable period of time it turns OFF channel #1 while turning ON channel #2, then turn OFF channel #2 while turning ON channel #3, then turn OFF channel #3 while turning ON channel #4, then repeat. This creates the illusion that the lights are moving in one direction. Some digital lighting chasers are made to do the above described single light chase pattern along with other combinations of Turning ON and OFF of the light to create different sequences like forward light chase, backward light chase, bouncing, dark chase (1 channel OFF while all 3 others ON), etc... Also, more than 4 channel chasers are used to create more effects and to animate illuminated objects.

Chase circuits using LEDs are commonly built by electronics hobbyists with timer (such as the 555 timer IC) and counter (such as the 4017, which allows up to 10 channels) integrated circuits.
