= Landscape lighting =

Outdoor illumination of gardens and landscapes

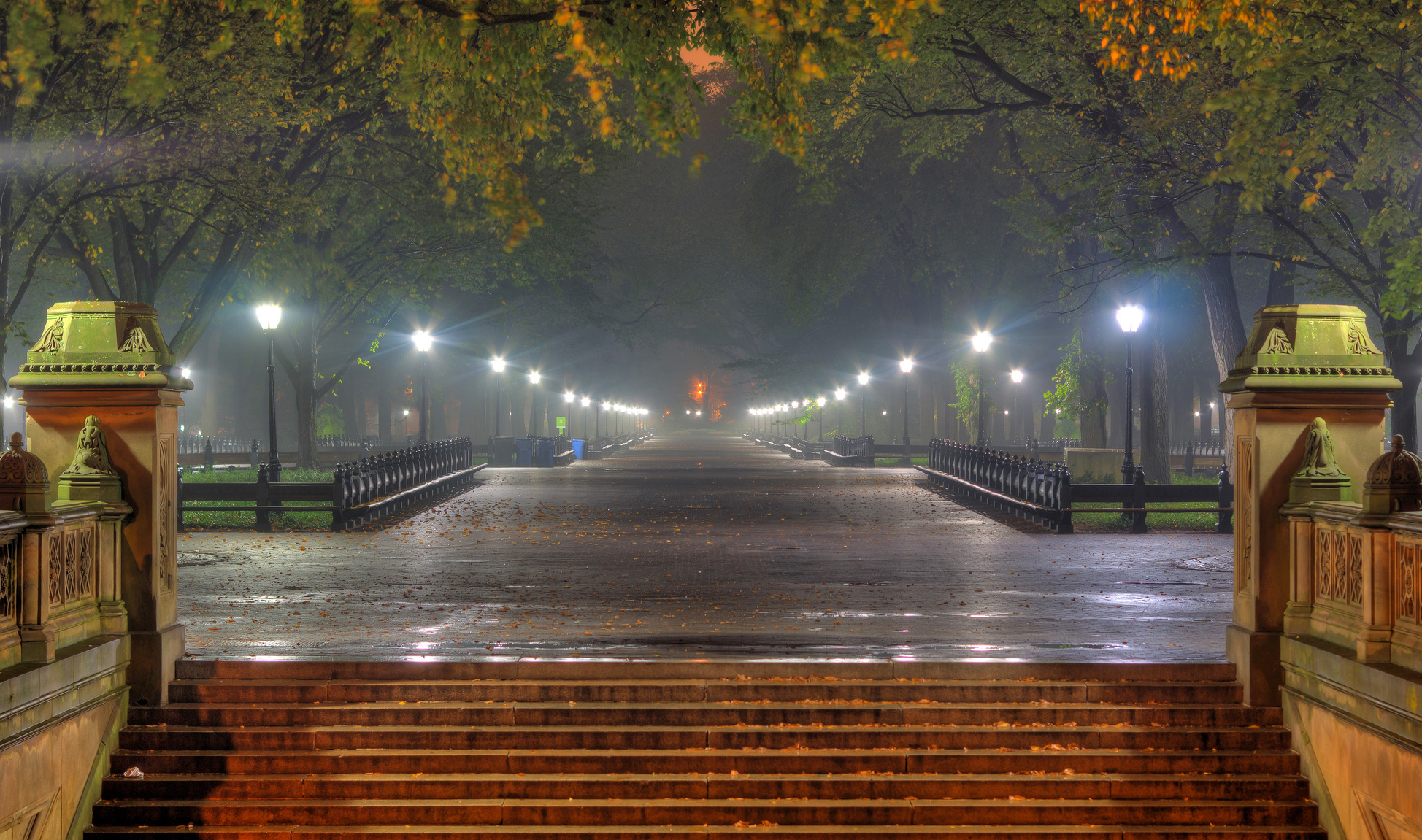
Central Park on a foggy night

Landscape lighting or garden lighting refers to the use of outdoor illumination of private gardens and public landscapes; for the enhancement and purposes of safety, nighttime aesthetics, accessibility, security, recreation and sports, and social and event uses.

Light pollution is exacerbated by excessive, misdirected, or obtrusive use of light.

== History ==
=== Early design ===
The public landscape and gardens have been illuminated for as long as interior structures have – for beauty, security, circulation, and social occasions; since ancient times by firelight from wood, candles, and animal-plant oil fells in torches, sconces and lanterns. Since the 17th century's introductions of new interior illumination fuels, the technology has then been used outdoors and in gardens. As systems were developed for power delivery, Gas lighting of the 19th century and electric light of the 20th century became part of exterior functioning and design.

=== Twenty-first century ===
Conventionally generated and sourced electricity remains the most used source for landscape lighting in the early twenty-first century. With the combination of increasing demand for more efficient lighting, increasing availability of sustainable designs, global warming considerations, and aesthetic and safety concerns in garden and landscape design the methods and equipment of outdoor illumination have been evolving. The increasing use of LEDs, solar power, low voltage fixtures, energy efficient lamps, and energy-saving lighting design are examples of innovation in the field.

== Lighting components ==
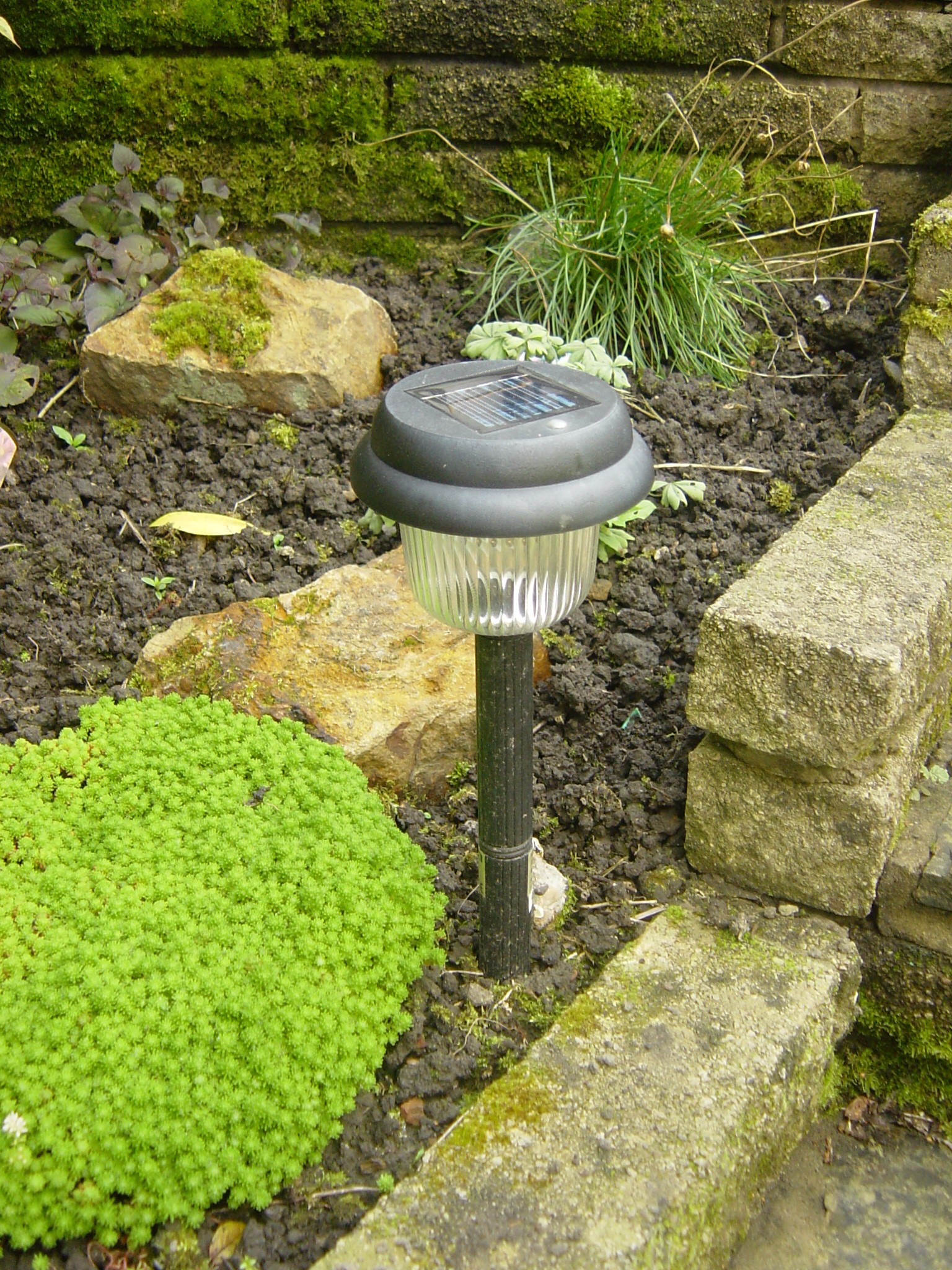
A solar lamp in a private garden

There are many different types of landscape lighting systems, controls and switching, wiring connections, fixture types, functions-purposes-styles, and light sources.

Components can include:

- Power
  - connection to main property power source (code and permit determined)
  - Transformers (12v and multi-tap transformers)
  - Timers
  - Light sensor switching (photocells)
  - motion sensor switching
  - Manual 'light switches'
  - automated light switching units-systems
  - remote lighting switching - on-property devices, off-site phone or online systems
- Electric wiring
  - conduit - underground for line voltage, vulnerable locations, under or in constructed elements-pavements
  - cable, wire - underground per codes for line and low voltage, above ground at stake-mounted and tree mounted fixtures.
- Light fixtures - fixed location - line voltage (120 V U.S. or 240 V Europe) and low voltage (12 V U.S.)
  - Post mount - column mount
  - Address light
  - Wall mount
  - Ceiling mount - hanging fixture
  - Security lights
  - Tree lights - up and down lights
  - In-grade fixtures- uplights buried in-ground - top flush with surface
  - Adjustable aim "bullet" - uplight
  - sports court lights - i.e.: tennis courts
  - portable fixtures "hard-wired" or "plug-in" 'wet location rated' interior style fixtures
  - string lighting - "holiday lights" - bulbs and LED
- Light fixtures - low voltage (12V U.S.) - modest location adjustments
  - path lights
  - area lights
  - uplights (directional, spot, and flood lights)- stake mount
  - wall lights - surface mount
  - tree-mount lights - down lights
  - deck lights - surface mount
  - well lights - mounted below grade
  - hardscape lights- integrated into walls.
  - step lights - recessed into catherine risers
  - rope lighting - fiber optics
- Solar powered
  - Solar panels
  - Batteries
  - Photosensors

== Underwater ==
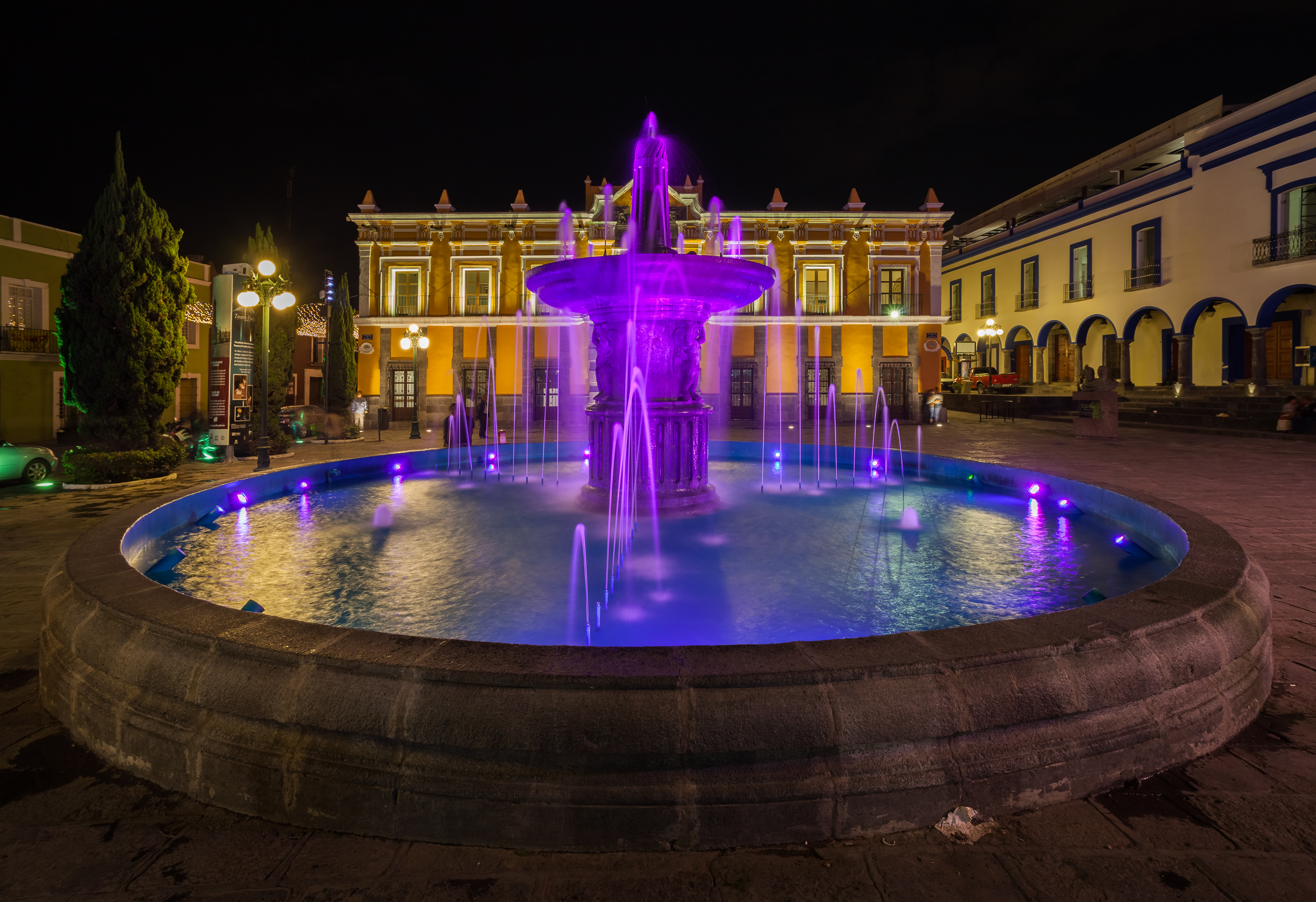
An illuminated fountain at the Teatro Principal in Mexico

- Water features
  - swimming pools
  - hot tubs
  - plunge pools
  - water gardens
  - reflecting pools
  - fountains
  - garden ponds
  - constructed streams and waterfalls
- Light sources - underwater
  - fixed mount fixtures - i.e.: pool wall light
  - movable uplights
  - fiber optic lights
  - floating fixture lights - rechargeable battery & solar photovoltaic

== See also ==
- Architectural lighting design
- Beam angle
- Garden designer
- Landscape architect
- Landscape designer
- Lighting designer
- Lighting for the elderly
