= Triple-click =

Computer input action

Triple-click is the action of clicking a computer mouse button three times quickly without moving the mouse. Along with clicking and double-clicking, triple-clicking allows three different actions to be associated with the same mouse button. Criticism of the double-click mechanism is even more valid for triple-clicks. However, few applications assign critical actions to a triple click.

== Examples of usage ==
=== On text ===
In most text processing programs and edit controls triple-clicking with the primary mouse button (the left button for right-handers) on the text selects the entire line. If the edit control is not multiline, the entire text is selected.

=== Microsoft Word ===
A triple-click within a paragraph in the text area selects the entire paragraph. A triple-click in the left margin (when the mouse pointer is an up-and-to-the-right arrow) selects the entire document.

=== Microsoft Works ===
A triple-click within a paragraph in the text area selects the line. A triple-click in the left margin (when the mouse pointer is an up-and-to-the-right arrow) selects the entire document.

=== Corel WordPerfect ===
A triple-click within a paragraph in the text area selects the sentence. A triple-click in the left margin (when the mouse pointer is an up-and-to-the-right arrow) selects the entire document.

=== Outlook and Outlook Express ===
A triple-click within a paragraph in the text area selects the entire paragraph.

=== Text fields ===
A triple-click in a text entry field (a text entry widget) selects the entire line of text. This is a standard feature of the widgets themselves, so works in most applications, on Linux as well as Windows.

=== Quark Express ===
A triple-click selects the current line. Four clicks selects the current paragraph. Five clicks selects the whole document.

=== Web browsers ===
==== Firefox 3.0 ====
In Firefox 3.0 a triple-click will highlight all text within any single HTML element on the page.

==== Firefox 3.5 ====
In Firefox 3.5 and upwards, a triple-click selects the entire paragraph. If the triple click is inside a content editable element, and is on the first paragraph, it selects the text, and the opening tag of the contentEditable element.

==== Internet Explorer 7 ====
In Internet Explorer 7 a triple-click will highlight all text within any single HTML element on the page. If there is an article with multiple paragraphs one can highlight an entire paragraph with a triple-click.

==== Opera ====
In Opera a triple-click will select all text within a sentence while automatically popping up a list of commands to apply to the selected text. A quadruple-click will select all text within a single paragraph while keeping the aforementioned popup open.

==== Safari 3.0 ====
In Safari 3.0 a triple-click will highlight all text within any single HTML element on the page. If there is an article with multiple paragraphs one can highlight an entire paragraph with a triple-click.

==== Chrome ====
In Google Chrome (and by extension ChromeOS), triple-clicking any part of a Web page will cause the nearest text node to be highlighted completely.

== Adjusting speed ==
Adjusting speed of triple-click depends on the operating system:

- On Windows XP triple-clicking has the same time as double-click and changing the double-click setting affects triple-click behavior as well.

== See also ==
- Single-click
- Double-click
