= Marquee (structure) =

Structure on the front of a hotel or theatre

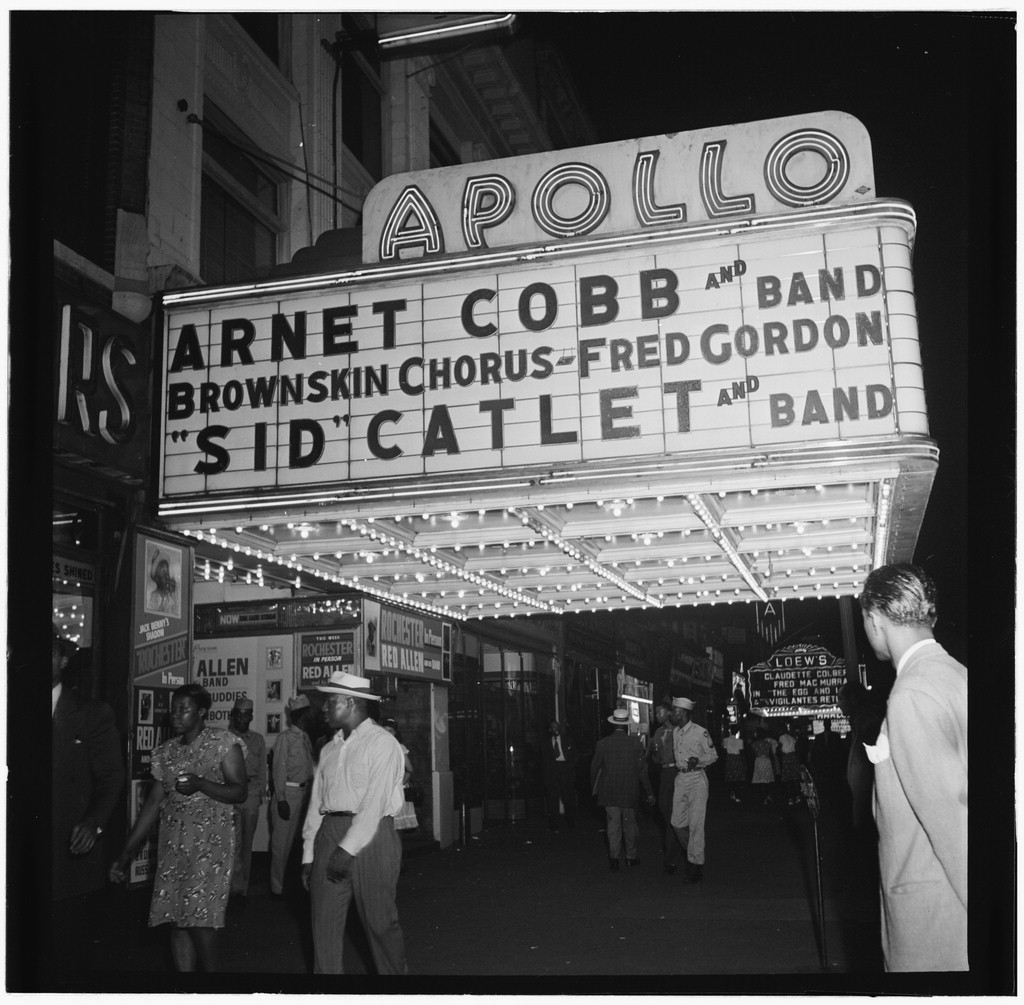
Apollo Theater marquee, New York City c. 1947

A marquee is most commonly a structure placed over the entrance to a hotel, theatre, casino, train station, or similar building. It often has signage stating either the name of the establishment or, in the case of theatres, the play or movie and the artist(s) appearing at that venue. The marquee is sometimes identifiable by a surrounding compound of light bulbs, usually yellow or white, that flash intermittently or as chasing lights.

== Etymology ==
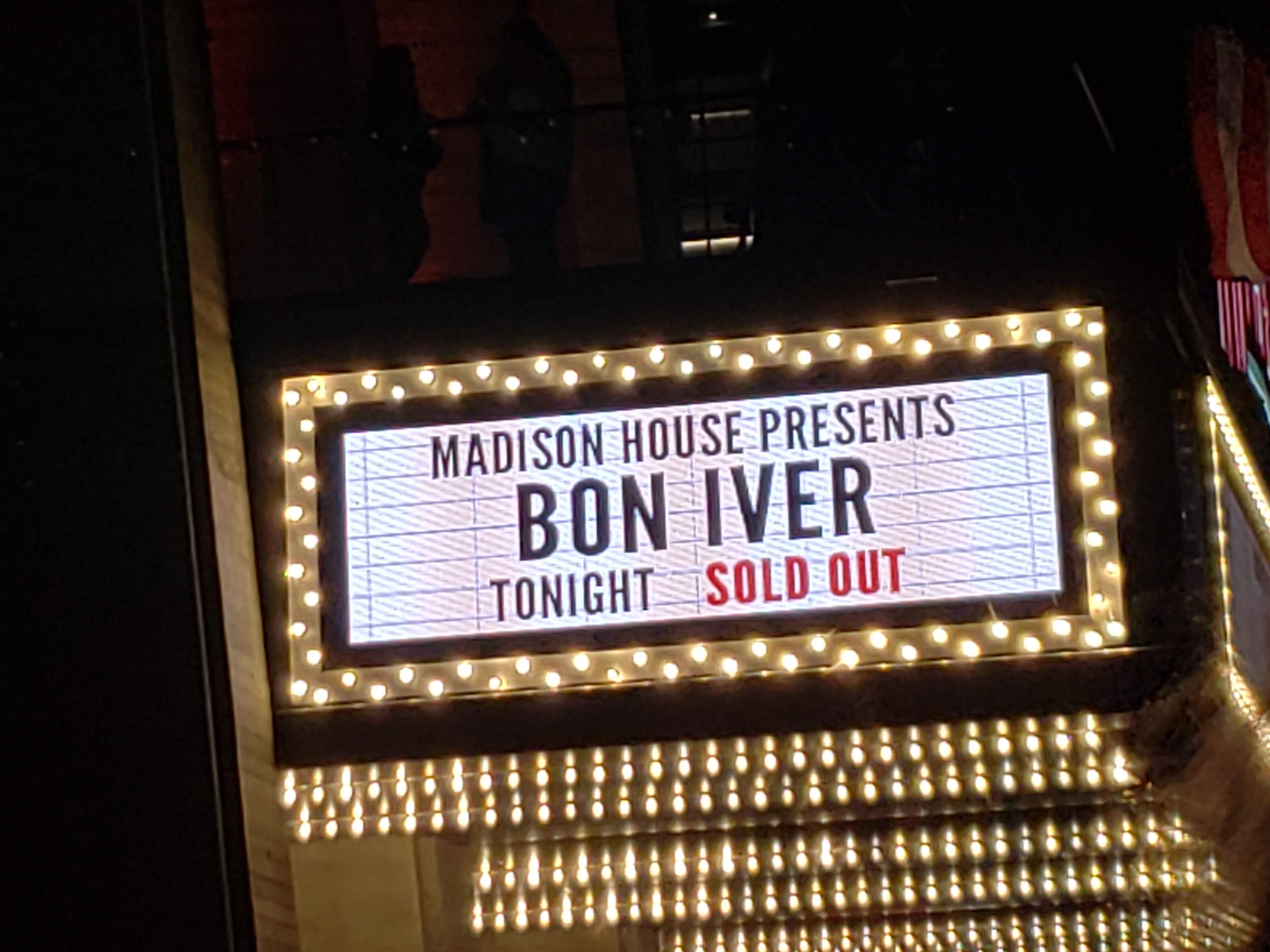
A marquee outside The Anthem advertises a sold-out Bon Iver concert

The current usage of the modern English word marquee, that in US English refers specifically to a canopy projecting over the main entrance of a theater, which displays details of the entertainment or performers, was documented in the academic journal American Speech in 1926: "Marquee, the front door or main entrance of the big top." In British English "marquee" refers more generally to a large tent, usually for social uses. The English word marquee is derived from the Middle French word marquise (the final /z/ probably being mistaken as -s plural), the feminine form corresponding to marquis ('nobleman'). The word marquise was also used to refer to various objects and fashions regarded as elegant or pleasing, hence: a kind of pear (1690), a canopy placed over a tent (1718), a type of settee (1770), a canopy in front of a building (1835), a ring with an elongated stone or setting, a diamond cut as a navette (late 19th century), and a style of woman's hat (1889). The oldest form of the word's root *merg- meant "boundary, border." Other words that descended from this Proto-Indo-European root include margin, mark, and margrave.

Early examples of the modern use of marquee include

- 1931, The American Mercury: "Marquee, the canopy at the main entrance [of a circus]."
- 1933, Billboard, The marquee of the Rivoli, where Samarang is playing, reads: 'One of the most exciting films ever shown.'
- 1967, The Boston Globe: "British actors mean little on an American movie marquee and Sherlock Holmes always seems old-fashioned."

== History ==
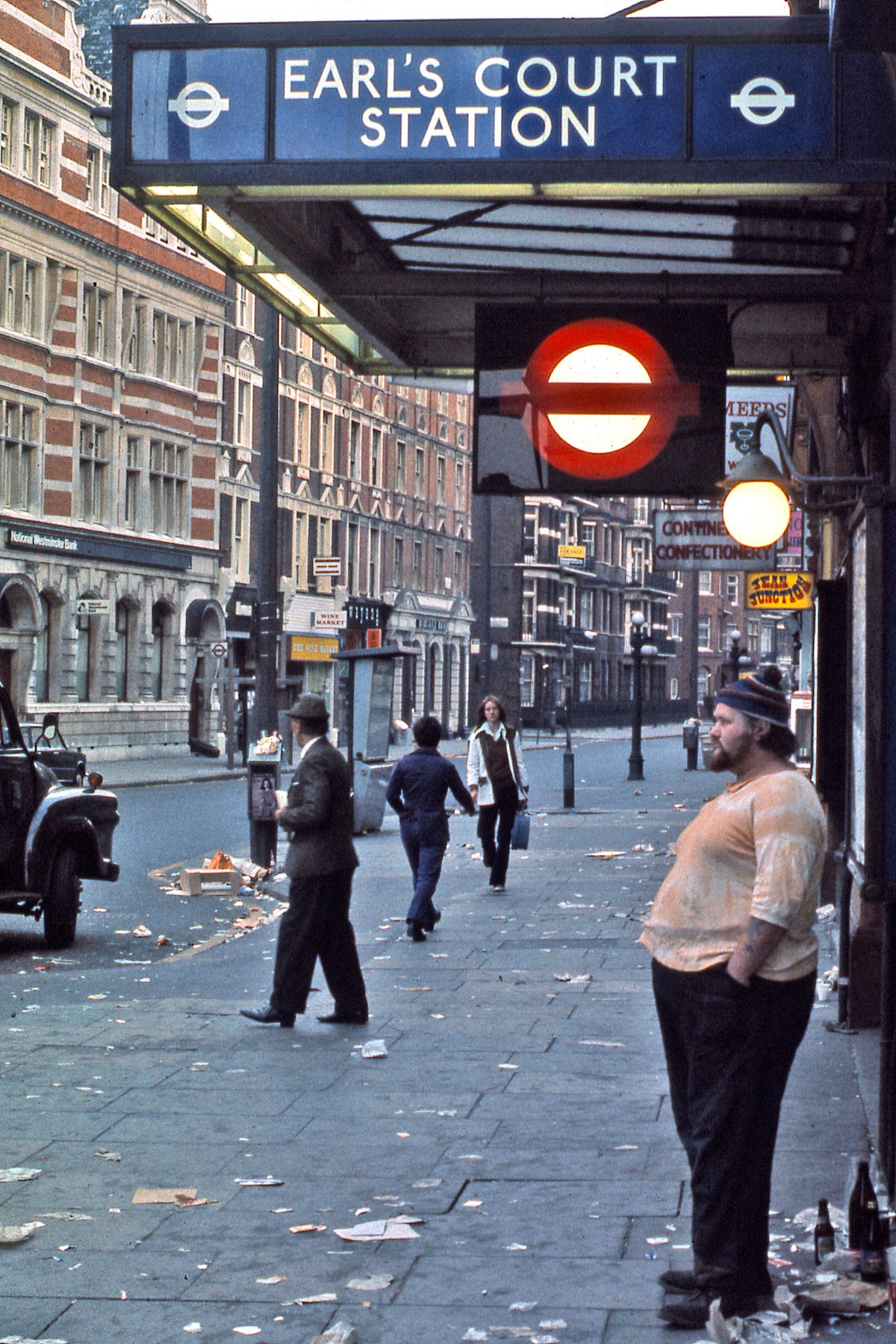
Marquee outside Earl's Court tube station, London, 1973.

Movie marquee designs in the United States are closely related to the social, political, and economic forces of the 20th century. The invention of the automobile influenced many elements of theater architecture. The marquee in particular became larger, and stood out from the street to serve as a physical and aesthetic landmark from other businesses along the sidewalk. The shape also evolved from a small rectangle to a trapezoid, making it more readable to automobile traffic. The text also became less detailed but larger. The larger size of the sign and text, combined with the flashing lights and color, made the façade easily visible to fast-passing cars. Movie marquee designs in the 1930s prompted theater historian Ben M. Hall to call them "electric tiaras."

During World War II, aesthetic considerations of the marquee were dictated by the availability of labor and materials. Building materials such as steel, copper, bronze, and aluminum were limited. Even in the postwar years, these building materials were mostly dedicated to building civilian housing for returning soldiers and their families. Concrete and glass, two building materials that were not restricted, became essential to movie theater architects. Light was also an unrestricted resource for architects, and combined with glass it produced striking visual effects. The mild climate of certain locations, such as the American West Coast, also permitted the use of lightweight materials such as porcelain and plastics in marquees. Another benefit of using light and glass together (besides the dramatic appearance it created) was the economic bonus of it being cheap.

Marquees are also used to illuminate the name of an arcade game at the top of its cabinet.

== See also ==
- Billboard
- Overhang (architecture)
