= Microsoft Mouse =

Computer mouse released by Microsoft in 1983

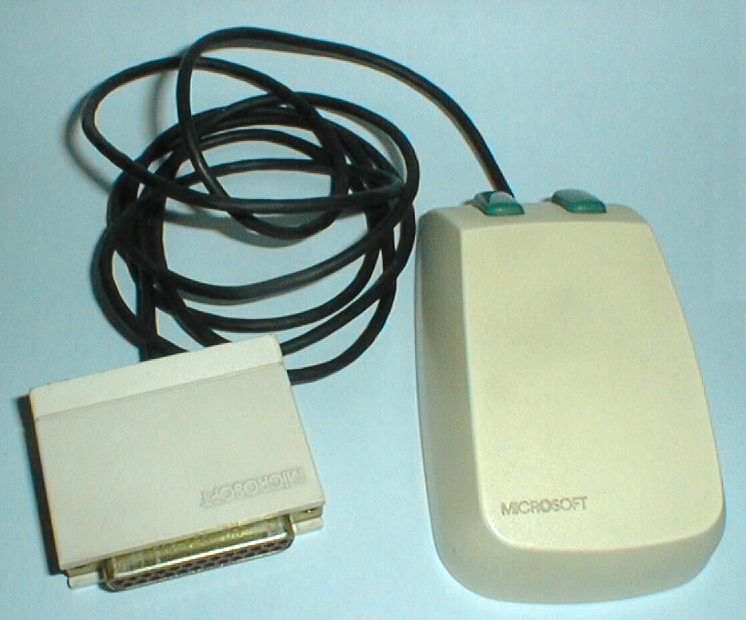
- The Microsoft Mouse (serial variant)
- Design firm: Microsoft
- Manufacturer: Alps Electric
- Introduced: May 2, 1983; 43 years ago
- Cost: $195 (= $630 in 2025)
- Type: Computer mouse
- Ports: DE-9, DB-25

The Microsoft Mouse, also known by its nicknames green-eyed mouse or green-eyed monster, is a computer mouse developed by Microsoft and released in 1983, designed to work with the IBM Personal Computer. It was the company's first ever mouse and came bundled with the first version of its Microsoft Word word processing software, intended to get users familiar with the then-abstract concept of the cursor pointing mouse device. The Microsoft Mouse has a pair of green buttons, and as with other early mice of the time, it uses a steel ball for tracking. It was succeeded by the "gray-eyed" mouse in 1985 and then the "dove bar" mouse in 1987.

== Development ==
While Microsoft was primarily a software company, the success of their 1980 product SoftCard for the Apple II indicated to its CEO Bill Gates that temporary hardware investments can prove beneficial for Microsoft software (in this case Microsoft BASIC). The company was developing major software projects Microsoft Word for MS-DOS as well as Windows, but realized that the lack of mice popularity and familiarity would prevent take-up of their software making use of a graphical cursor. The Microsoft hardware group was formed in 1982 to build a pointing mouse compatible with the IBM Personal Computer and force the industry to adapt. The mouse followed the release onto market of a three-button mouse for the IBM PC by Mouse Systems in 1982.

[..] even on a character-mode display, being able to move the cursor around in a natural way, we thought was a big advantage. We tied it to Word so that we had a bundle with Word and the Mouse. But then people who didn't like the Mouse thought they shouldn't buy Word. So, it was a little bit of a problem.

— Bill Gates, Smithsonian Institution interview

The Microsoft Mouse

Microsoft thought that the two-button concept, as seen on the Xerox Star (and unlike the three-button Xerox Alto or one-button Apple Lisa mice) was "the right approach", according to Gates. Microsoft paid patent fees to Xerox and SRI International, where the mouse was invented. The mouse was released on May 2, 1983 for an initial price of US$195 (equivalent to $630 in 2025) including its bundled software. The Japanese company Alps Electric produced the mouse. The initial version was a bus mouse with a 9-pin DE-9 connector connecting to a Intel 8255 based Microsoft ISA bus expansion card. In February 1984, a serial version was released with a DB-25 connector.

== Bundled software ==
The first generation Microsoft Mouse was bundled with the first versions of Microsoft Word (WORD.COM) as well as the mouse-oriented text editor Notepad(NOTEPAD.COM), an on-screen teaching tutorial, a musical piano program (PIANO.EXE), and a graphic game called “Life” (LIFE.EXE). A few months later, version 2.0 of the mouse software came out which introduced one of the first home computer color bitmap creation programs, called “Doodle” (DOODLE.EXE).

Also, a mouse menu system (MAKEMENU.EXE) was designed to be like a macro utility to enable existing DOS applications (e.g. VisiCalc) to work with the mouse by simulating keystrokes.

In 1985, Mouse 3.0 update introduced support for the IBM AT PC and new high-resolution graphics devices. Then in version 4.0, Doodle was replaced by a rebadged copy of ZSoft PC Paintbrush called “PC Paintbrush” (PBRUSH.EXE). This would later be re-tooled and included with Windows 1.0, and formed the basis for Microsoft Paint.

== Driver ==
All versions of the Microsoft Mouse could be used with MS-DOS compatible systems as well as Xenix. Because MS-DOS had no framework to understand a pointing device, Microsoft wrote the software driver MOUSE.COM (also MOUSE.SYS) as a terminate-and-stay-resident program. INT 33H is the 16-bit software interrupt that Microsoft made for mouse input and that became an industry standard.

== Reception ==
According to Bill Gates, in a 1993 interview with the Smithsonian Institution, 50,000 units of the Mouse were ordered and "it took over a year to sell the first 50,000". There has been an unverified claim, likely a myth, on some websites that Microsoft built 100,000 units with only 5,000 mice sold to end users.

== Successors ==
=== Second generation Microsoft Mouse ===
In October 1985, Microsoft introduced the "gray-eyed" Microsoft Mouse. It doubled the resolution and sensitivity to 200 ppi (points per inch), requiring less surface area for movement. The mouse also had a redesigned body and a rubber-covered steel ball replaced the solid steel ball of the first mouse. Instead of the buttons stopping right at the nose edge, the gray buttons extended far up over the curved top shell of the casing.

The gray-eyed Mouse shipped with Microsoft Mouse 5.0 software. In 1986, a variant was released using the InPort interface, and in 1987 a variant was released using the PS/2 port for the then newly released IBM PS/2 computers.

=== Third generation Microsoft Mouse ===
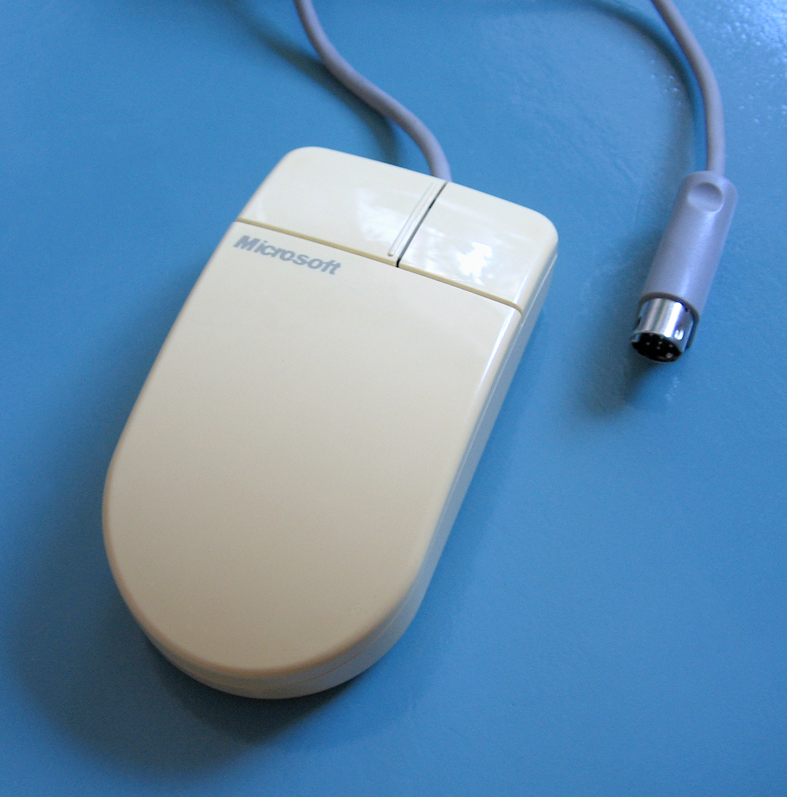
Microsoft's third generation mouse (proprietary InPort version)

In September 1987, the third generation "dove bar" Microsoft Mouse (so called for the curved palm rest's resemblance to a Dove soap bar) was introduced, in variants for Microsoft's InPort, serial port and PS/2 port. It was designed by Matrix Product Design and its shape made to have softer angles. The trackball was moved to the front.

While mice sales started gaining traction by 1987, the amount of users of PC clones using mice was still as low as one in ten at this time. However, while it took Microsoft five years to reach a million mouse sales, it reached 2 million in June 1989, less than a year after the previous milestone, with high popularity of the new dove bar mouse. In March 1991, less than a year after the major launch of Windows 3.0, cumulative Microsoft Mouse sales reached 6 million.

By the time this Microsoft Mouse was in line for replacement in 1993, Microsoft and rival Logitech held a combined 85% market share of computer mice.

=== Microsoft Mouse 2.0 ===
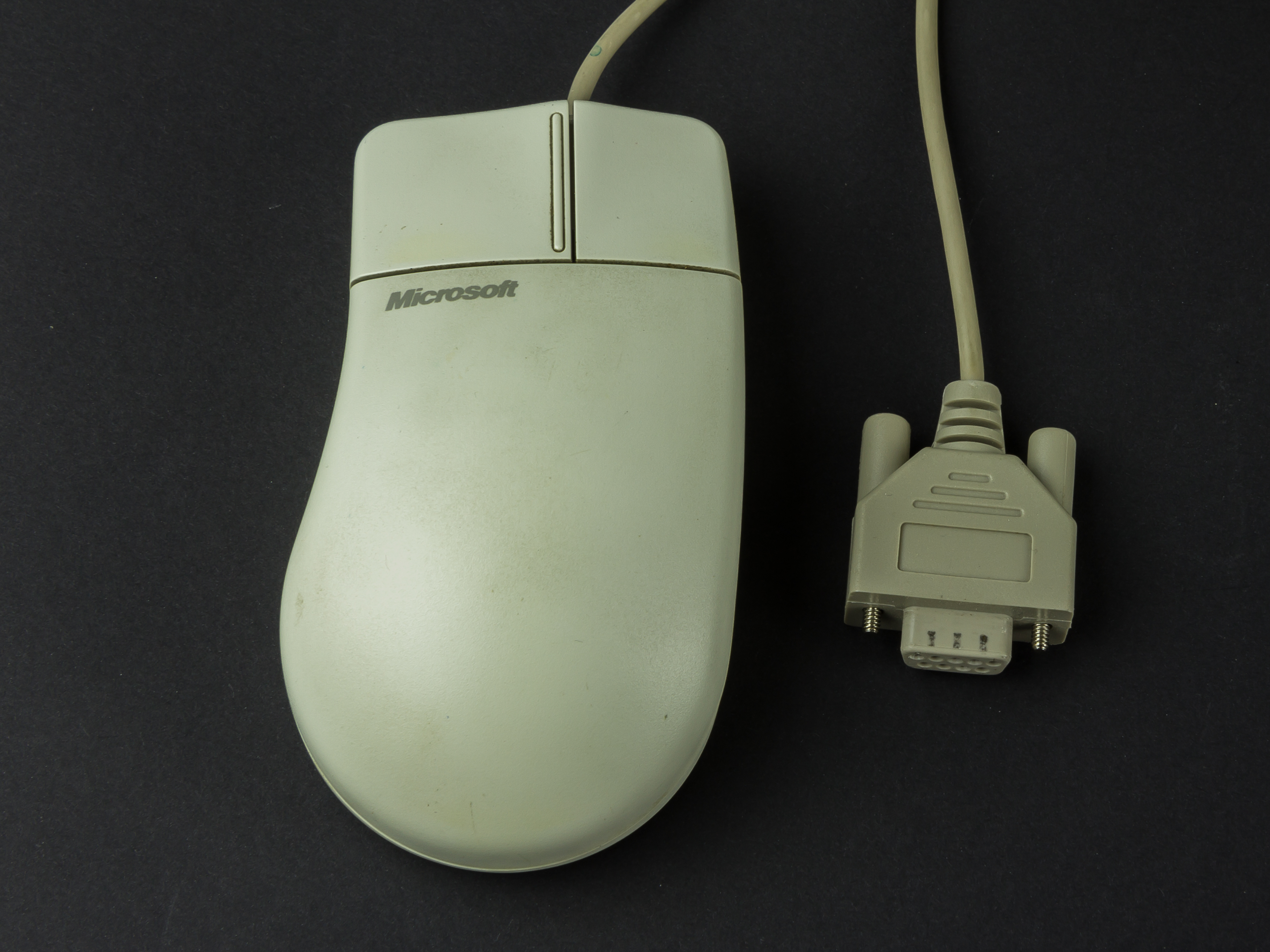
Microsoft Mouse 2.0 (serial version)

The next evolution in Microsoft's flagship mouse was the Microsoft Mouse 2.0, introduced on April 27, 1993. Nicknamed the "kidney bean" mouse, it was an ergonomic shape with a curving sloped ridge for right-handed users, radically different from the symmetrical and blocky mice typically in use at the time by computer users.

Designed by Steve Kaneko and Edie Adams at Microsoft, it was the result of a $10 million ergonomic research study. Microsoft went through fifty designs as part of the two-year development that was internally codenamed "Carrera", in reference to the Porsche Carrera.

The Microsoft Mouse 2.0 came in both DE-9 serial and in PS/2 port variants. Initially it was released in a glossy shade but a matte version was later made as well with the name 2.0a. This mouse became very popular. According to The New York Times, 17 million units of the Mouse 2.0 were sold in the year 1995 alone. The mouse was also complemented with IntelliPoint software to reconfigure and customize the buttons in Windows and DOS. Additionally it increased public awareness for "ergonomic" hardware and Microsoft also released its ergonomic Natural Keyboard soon after. The Microsoft Mouse 2.0 design served as the basis for the IntelliMouse, which debuted in 1996.

The Microsoft Mouse 2.0 is also inducted in the permanent collection of the Museum of Modern Art in the field of human-computer interaction design.

== Legacy ==
Microsoft credits the original Microsoft Mouse as the company's entry into hardware peripherals. The original trio released during the 1980s are all predecessors for a wide variety of mice developed by Microsoft's hardware division since then, its diversification beginning with the trackball "Microsoft BallPoint Mouse" in 1991 and since then products including the Microsoft Home line (from 1995), IntelliMouse line (from 1996), Natural Wireless Laser Mouse (2006), SideWinder line, the Arc Mouse (from 2008), Microsoft Sculpt Ergonomic Mouse (from 2013) and others. In January 2024, Microsoft announced that it would license the design and manufacturing of its current mice (as well as keyboards) products to Incase, as part of an effort to focus more on its premium Surface-branded accessories.

== See also ==
- IBM PS/2 Mouse, competing mouse from IBM (also manufactured by Alps)
- Microsoft IntelliMouse
