= IBM PS/2 Mouse =

Computer mouse

Personal System/2 Mouse
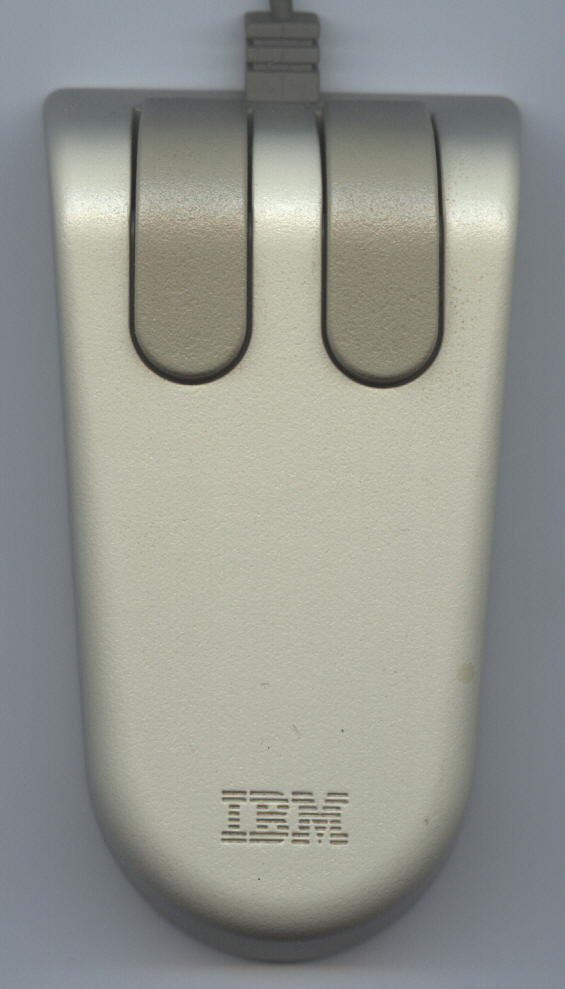
- An original Personal System/2 Mouse, manufactured circa 1987
- Design firm: IBM
- Manufacturer: Alps Electric
- Introduced: April 2, 1987; 39 years ago
- Discontinued: October 20, 1992; 33 years ago
- Type: Computer mouse
- Ports: PS/2

The Personal System/2 Mouse (part number 6450350) is a computer mouse introduced by IBM in 1987 for the Personal System/2 (PS/2) family of personal computers. The PS/2 Mouse was the first computer mouse ever released by IBM, as well as the first mouse with a PS/2 port interface. It was manufactured for IBM by Alps Electric, who also produced the Microsoft Mouse, which was then the top-selling mouse for the PC. The PS/2 Mouse sold well, commanding a 10 percent market share in 1990, behind only Microsoft and Logitech. IBM continued selling the original PS/2 Mouse until 1992, when they released a redesigned mouse for the IBM PS/ValuePoint.

== Development and specifications ==
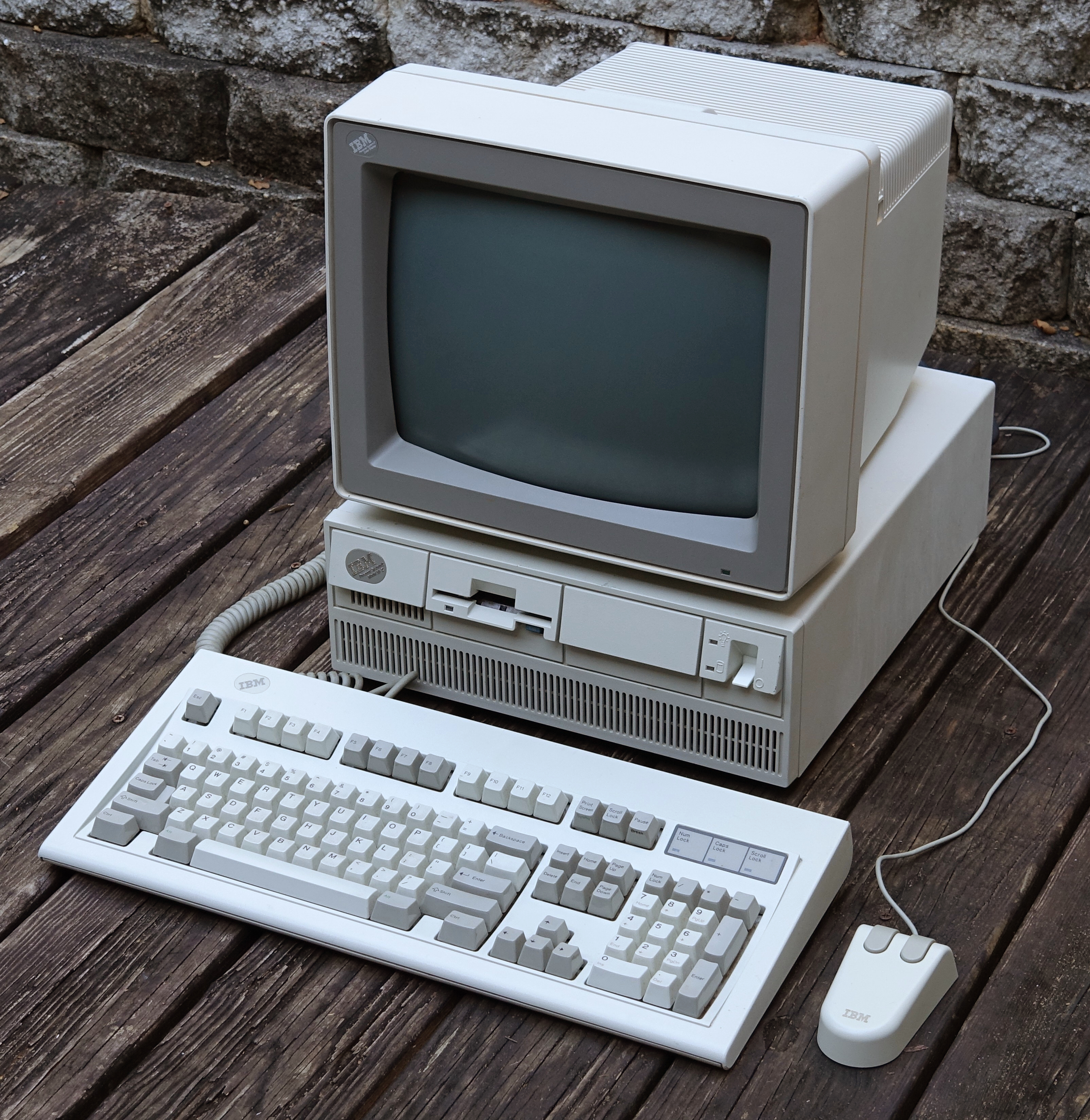
The PS/2 Mouse situated next to a PS/2 Model 50 Z from 1988

The Personal System/2 Mouse was developed by IBM for the Personal System/2 (PS/2), a family of personal computers that served as the successor to the IBM Personal Computer (IBM PC). It was IBM's first ever computer mouse, released at a time when mice were gaining mainstream acceptance among users of personal computers, thanks to the rise of graphical user interfaces (GUIs), which demanded the use of mice or other pointing devices. The advent of desktop publishing and CAD/CAM software for the IBM PC platform also served as impetus for the development of a mouse of IBM's own design. The design of the PS/2 Mouse was led by Pedro Alfonso, an industrial designer for IBM since 1983 who was instrumental in the design of the PS/2 family at large, and James R. Lewis, a human factors engineer hired by IBM in 1981.

The PS/2 Mouse was also the first with a PS/2 port interface, a standard for connecting both pointing devices and keyboards which debuted the with PS/2. It competed with other standards such as Microsoft's InPort and serial port mice. These competing standards each had their own trade-offs, including needing to occupy an expansion slot or a serial port (or both); these came at a premium in early personal computers. The PS/2 Mouse was released on April 2, 1987, alongside the inaugural line-up of the PS/2, consisting of the Models 30, 50, 60, and 80. All models in the PS/2 family were designed with PS/2 ports built into their system boards.

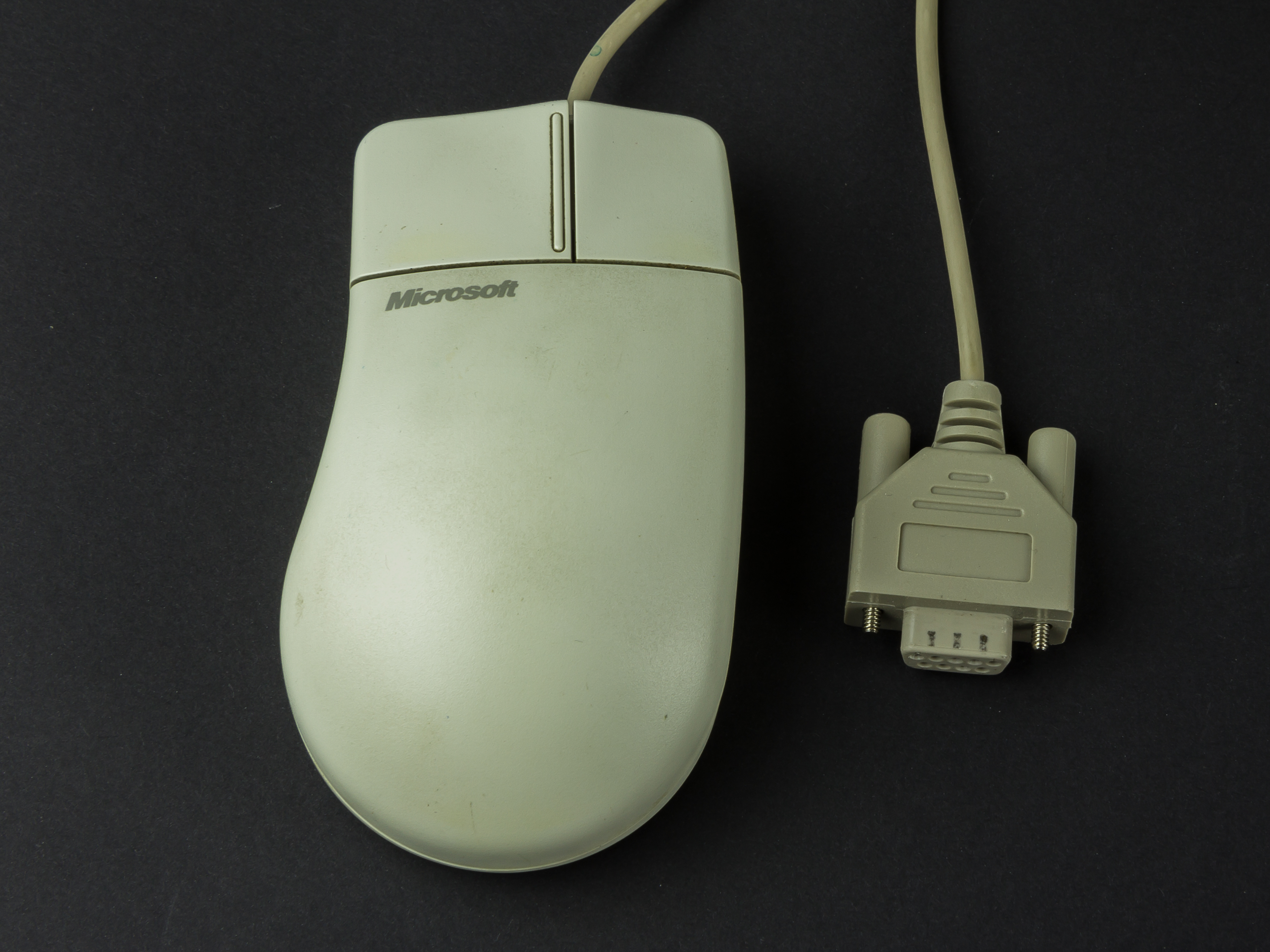
The PS/2 Mouse competed with the Microsoft Mouse (pictured). Both shared the same manufacturer, Alps Electric.

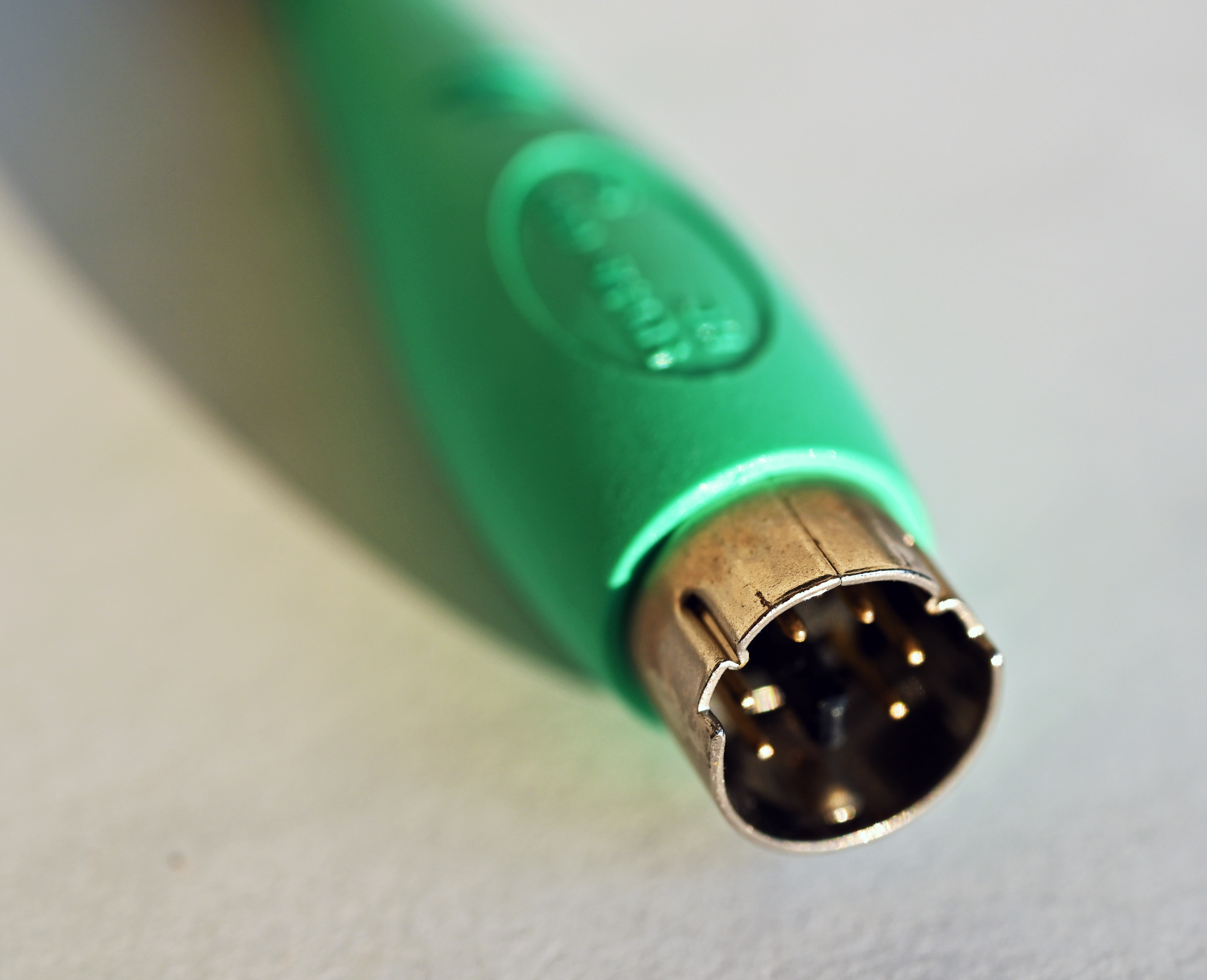
PS/2 mouse plug

The PS/2 Mouse was manufactured by Alps Electric of Tokyo, Japan. Alps also manufactured the Microsoft Mouse for Microsoft. Despite sharing the same manufacturer, the PS/2 Mouse retailed for half the price of the Microsoft Mouse. IBM designed the PS/2 Mouse to be electrically compatible with the Microsoft Mouse. Accordingly, IBM shipped it with a copy of Microsoft's device driver for the Microsoft Mouse. In turn, Microsoft became the second-ever manufacturer of PS/2-port mice when it released a version of the Microsoft Mouse outfitted with a module that adapted the InPort interface to the PS/2 port interface in mid-1987. The PS/2 port eventually became the predominant standard for connecting mice to personal computers well into the 1990s until being supplanted by USB.

The PS/2 Mouse is a mechanical mouse, with a rubber ball on the bottom gliding over a flat surface to translate directional movement on a pair of rollers inside. The mouse itself measures 2.75 by 4.5 by 1.375 inches (6.99 by 11.43 by 3.49 cm). It has a base sensitivity of 200 dots per inch (dpi). Like the Microsoft Mouse, the PS/2 Mouse features two buttons for left and right clicking. Its distinctive shape was intended to complement IBM's PS/2 computer systems. It features a tapering rounded heel for the palm to rest on and a flat back, with the two narrow buttons wrapping around the top edge of the mouse to the back side. Other contemporary mice featured a soap-bar shape, such as the Microsoft Mouse, or squared-off edges, such as Logitech's offerings. IBM supplied the PS/2 Mouse with a generous 9 feet (270 cm) cable, long enough to reach systems situated under the desk, as the tower-based PS/2 Models 60 and 80 often were.

Several authors posit that IBM developed the PS/2 Mouse in direct response to the commercial success of the Macintosh computer. As it was nearly useless without its mouse, Apple included one with the purchase of every Mac. Conversely, the PS/2 had a large software base which ran fine without such pointing devices, so IBM sold the PS/2 Mouse only as an option. According to Pierluigi Zappacosta, then the president of Logitech (one of the largest manufacturers of computer mice), the PS/2 Mouse vindicated Apple's GUI-driven approach: "I think Apple is really happy. IBM recognized the direction that Apple took with the graphics integration on the Macintosh, and saw that it was the right way to go on a PC. So IBM is saying, 'Apple was right'". Zappacosta also wrote that the influence of Microsoft's Windows operating system—then only two years old—could also be felt in IBM's decision to embrace the mouse: "Microsoft did a good job convincing IBM to go with the window approach. Windows without a mouse is nonsense". Both IBM and Microsoft were deep in development of a version of their OS/2 operating system featuring a GUI shell they called Presentation Manager when the PS/2 Mouse first came out.

== Reception ==
The PS/2 Mouse sold very well for IBM, commanding a 10 percent market share by 1990, or a little over three years after its release. It trailed only Microsoft and Logitech in market share. The commercial success of the original PS/2 Mouse allowed IBM to stay competitive in this market as it released successor designs well into the 1990s, although it was never as positively received as other brands of mice.

If Microsoft's mouse looks like a bar of Dove, IBM's $95 mouse looks like a Dove Bar.

— Jim Reid, in PC World

Mitt Jones of PC Magazine, reviewing the PS/2 Mouse a few months after its release in 1987, praised its engineering, build quality, and the long length of its cable, while lamenting the lack of device drives compatible with other mice and the sparseness of its documentation. He also wrote that the PS/2 Mouse was not as comfortably shaped as the Microsoft Mouse. Tom Stanton of the same publication found it ergonomically challenged, writing that its tapered shaped did not fit in the palm easily and that, due to the buttons wrapping over the top edge, his fingers clicking the buttons tended to cause the mouse to jump uncontrollably. Stanton also found the buttons too stiff. He concluded: "With all the resources at the company's disposal, you might expect world-class industrial design engineering. What you get is a desk accessory that matches the PS/2 but doesn't keep up". In a roundup of four computer mice in PC World, writer Jim Reid wrote that the PS/2 Mouse's buttons "require too much pressure, don't provide enough aural feedback, and forced one tester to arch his digits in order to press the buttons at all". He added that, "[n]onetheless, the good overall feel of the IBM mouse earned it a second-place ranking from the [PC World] testing team".

Mary Kathleen Flynn, also of PC Magazine, wrote in 1990 that, despite it still having a relatively high market share, the PS/2 Mouse was beginning to feel antiquated. She noted that its base sensitivity of 200 dpi was much lower than its 1990 contemporaries, that it had a design that was no longer fashionable, and that it lacked any pack-in software.

IBM continued selling the original PS/2 Mouse until 1992, when they released a redesigned mouse intended to coincide with the introduction of the PS/ValuePoint line of personal computers, released on October 20, 1992. The redesigned mouse more closely resembled the Microsoft Mouse. PC Week called the new mouse "well-designed" and "a vast improvement" over the original PS/2 Mouse.

== Sister model ==
External videos
- Overview and demonstration of the PS/2 Trackpoint by William Walsh (uxwbill) on YouTube

The shape and design of the PS/2 Mouse was later repurposed by IBM for the design of the PS/2 Trackpoint. This was a combination double-sided mouse and trackball, released as an accessory for the company's PS/2 Model L40 SX laptop in March 1991. IBM also made it generally available as an option for both desktop and portable models of PS/2 alongside the original PS/2 Mouse. It was able to be converted between a mouse and a trackball by way of a plastic hinge mechanism that allows the rubber ball of the mouse to protrude further outside of its opening. The mouse is flipped upside down after it has been configured for trackball operation, with the ball working with gravity to sit on the rollers. The buttons of the mouse side are disabled when configured for trackball operation; the trackball side of the mouse contains its own pair of buttons. IBM borrowed the Trackpoint name for the ThinkPad's pointing stick in 1992.

== See also ==
- Model M keyboard, the standard keyboard for the PS/2
