= IntelliMouse =

Series of computer mice from Microsoft

Side view of a Microsoft IntelliMouse mouse (IntelliMouse Optical 1.1)

IntelliMouse is a series of computer mice from Microsoft that were produced from 1996 to 2023. The IntelliMouse series is credited with a number of innovations; Microsoft was among the first mouse vendors to introduce a scroll wheel, an optical mouse, and dedicated auxiliary buttons on the side of the mouse. They use IntelliPoint drivers and its main competitor through the years has been Logitech.

Microsoft announced in April 2023 that the IntelliMouse would be discontinued alongside the rest of their non-Surface-branded peripherals; it was not part of the designs licensed in early 2025 to Incase under the branding "Designed by Microsoft".

== Model comparison table ==
Microsoft IntelliMouse-branded pointing devices
Name	Intro.	Buttons	Optical	USB protocol	Serial protocol	Ref.
IntelliMouse	1996	3	No	No	PS/2 or DE-9	
IntelliMouse Trackball	1997	3	No	No	PS/2 or DE-9	
IntelliMouse Pro	1998	3	No	No	PS/2 or DE-9	
IntelliMouse (USB Compatible)	1998	3	No	Yes	PS/2	
IntelliMouse with IntelliEye	1999	3	Yes	Yes	PS/2	
IntelliMouse Explorer	1999	5	Yes	Yes	PS/2	
IntelliMouse Optical	2000	5	Yes	Yes	PS/2	
Wireless IntelliMouse Explorer	2001	5	Yes	Yes	No	
IntelliMouse Explorer 4.0	2003	5	Yes	Yes	No	
Wireless IntelliMouse Explorer 2.0	2003	5	Yes	Yes	No	
IntelliMouse Explorer 3.0	2006	5	Yes	Yes	PS/2	
Classic IntelliMouse	2017	5	Yes	Yes	No	
Pro IntelliMouse	2019	5	Yes	Yes	No	

== IntelliEye and optical technologies ==
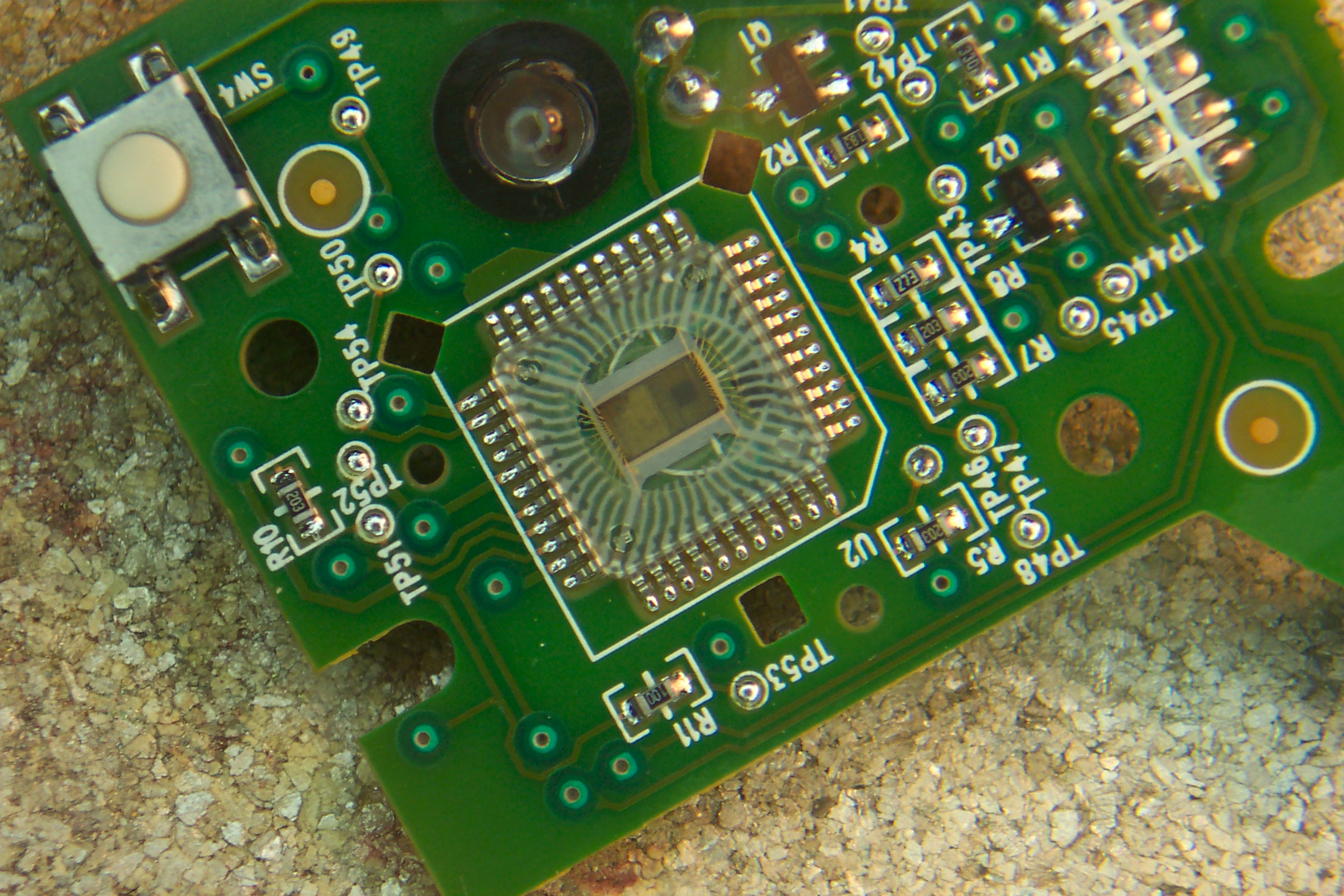
Optical sensor of a Microsoft Wireless IntelliMouse Explorer 1.0A

Microsoft developed an optical tracking technology called IntelliEye, eliminating the need for a mouse ball or mousepad. It boasted it as the "most radical computer mouse technology and design advancement" since computer mice were introduced in the 1960s. The technology was codeveloped with Agilent Technologies (a company then spun-off from Hewlett-Packard's semiconductor division) and debuted on the IntelliMouse Explorer in 1999.

IntelliEye technology was also used on non-IntelliMouse branded mice from Microsoft, such as the basic Wheel Mouse Optical and the TrackBall Explorer, both released in 2000.

Generation	Year	Sensor chip	dpi	Frames per second
IntelliEye (1st)	1999	Agilent HDNS-2000	400	1,500
IntelliEye (2nd)	2000	Agilent HDNS-2000	400	2,000
IntelliEye ("New")	2001	OSMLT04	400	6,000
High Definition Optical	2006	OSMLT04	400	9,000

== IntelliMouse (original kidney shape) ==
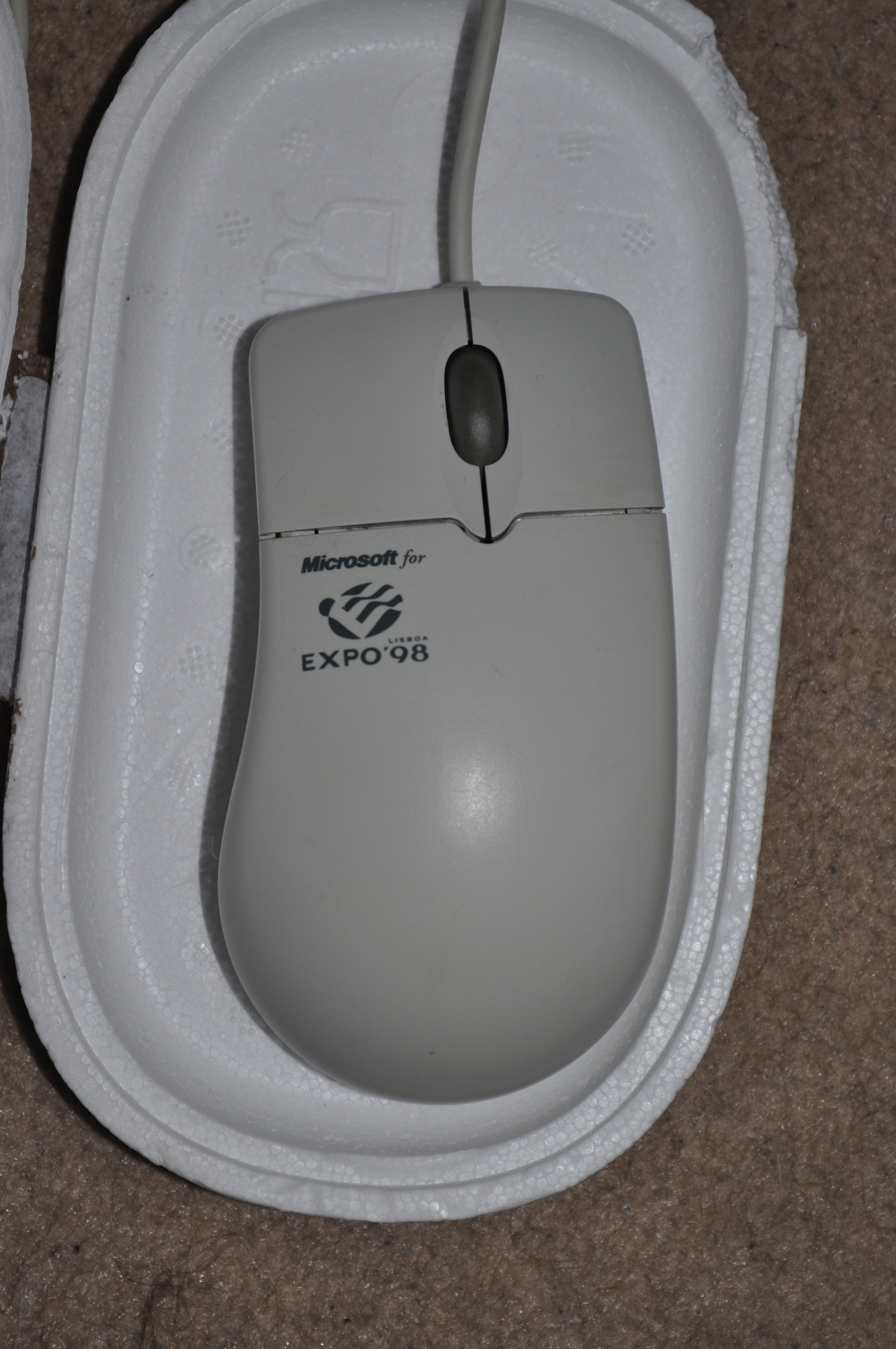
The IntelliMouse (with Expo '98 branding)

The first IntelliMouse was announced on July 22, 1996, with its stand-out feature being a scroll wheel. It had a scheduled domestic American release in November 1996 with an estimated price of US$84.95 (equivalent to $174 in 2025).

This mechanical ball mouse has an ergonomic design based on that of the Microsoft Mouse 2.0 "kidney mouse" from 1993. The industrial design of the IntelliMouse was done by Steve Kaneko (who did the Microsoft Mouse 2.0 as well) and by Carl Ledbetter. The concept of the scroll wheel inclusion was of Microsoft's Eric Michelman who viewed Microsoft Excel users struggling with scrolling down spreadsheets. The wheel and mechanism were made by Microsoft hardware engineers Kabir Siddiqui and Todd Holmdahl.

A USB version of the mouse was released in 1998 in time for Windows 98.

=== IntelliMouse with IntelliEye ===
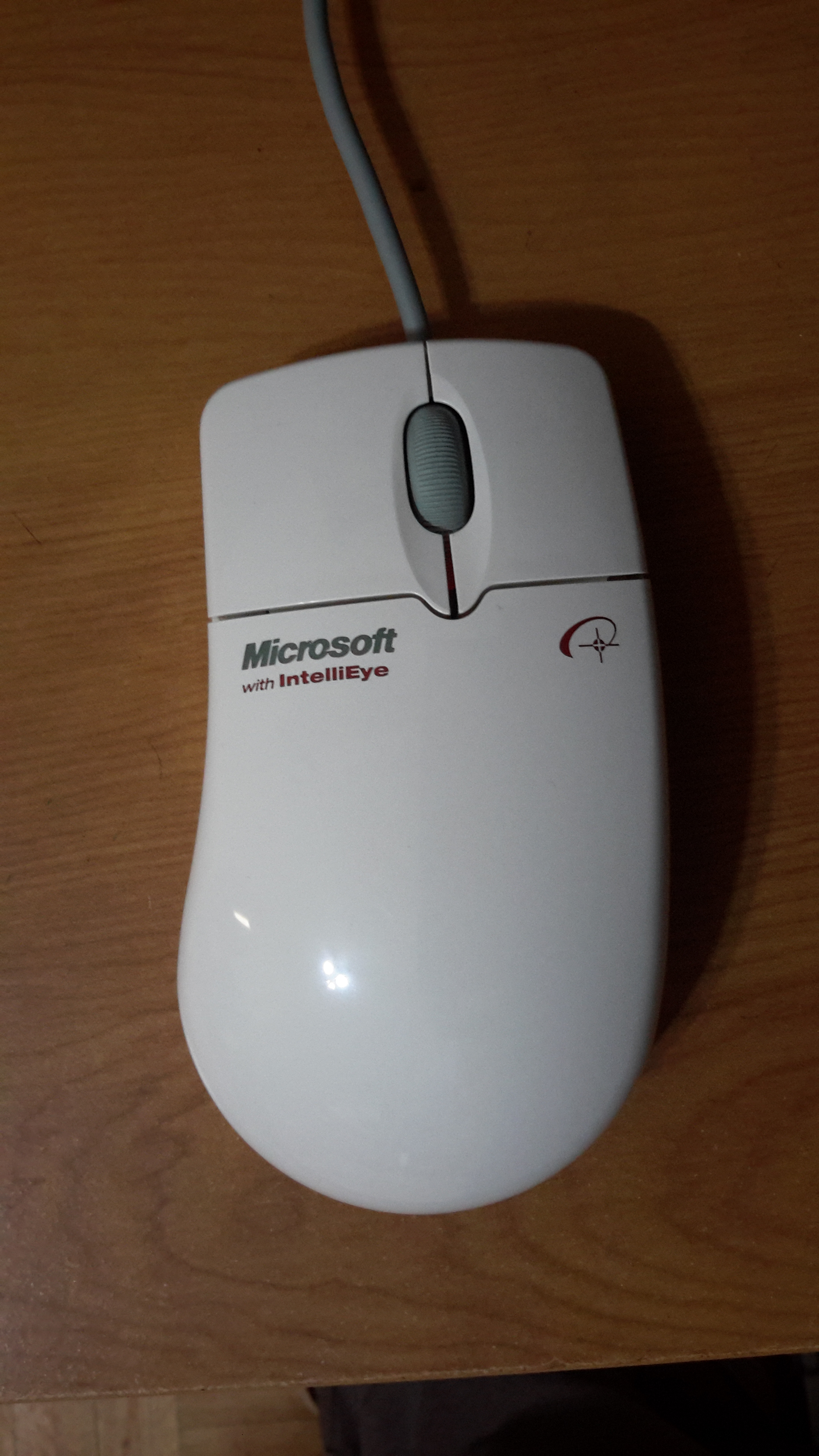
IntelliMouse with IntelliEye

The IntelliMouse with IntelliEye is an upgraded model of the original IntelliMouse with the same shape and buttons but with its ball removed, instead utilizing the optical IntelliEye technology. It was announced on April 19, 1999, at COMDEX. It was released on October 4, 1999 with an estimated retail price of US$54.95 (equivalent to $106 in 2025).

== IntelliMouse TrackBall ==
On November 14, 1997, Microsoft released the IntelliMouse TrackBall, a stationery mouse with a finger-operated trackball to control the cursor and featuring the signature IntelliMouse scroll wheel. It was released with an estimated price of US$84.95 (equivalent to $170 in 2025).

== IntelliMouse Pro ==
The IntelliMouse Pro mechanical ball mouse was released on May 28, 1998 as a redesign of the original IntelliMouse, featuring an asymmetrical shape (intended for right-hand use) with a more pronounced arch profile and lower top compared to the previous. It changes how the hand rests on the mouse using the high arching slope angled downwards towards the right of the mouse. This revision also added a rubberized texture around the perimeter. The IntelliMouse Pro was released with a price of US$74.95 (equivalent to $148 in 2025).

== Classic/IntelliMouse Explorer (original shape) ==
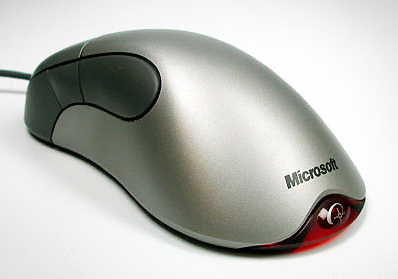
The original IntelliMouse Explorer

The IntelliMouse Explorer was introduced on April 19, 1999, at COMDEX and also exhibited at E3 1999, touting the benefits of its optical sensor for accuracy and reliability using their IntelliEye technology. It has five buttons (two on top, a scroll wheel that could be depressed, and two on the left side of the mouse intended for use with the thumb) and an asymmetrical shape designed for right-handed users. The Explorer is finished in silver, and features a glowing red "taillight" to emphasize its optical sensor.

The IntelliMouse Explorer was released on October 4, 1999 with an estimated retail price of US$74.95 (equivalent to $145 in 2025).

The Wargamer gave it their 2000 hardware of the year award. In 2005, PC World named the IntelliMouse Explorer to its list of "The 50 Greatest Gadgets of the Past 50 Years" as the first mainstream optical mouse.

=== Upgraded versions ===
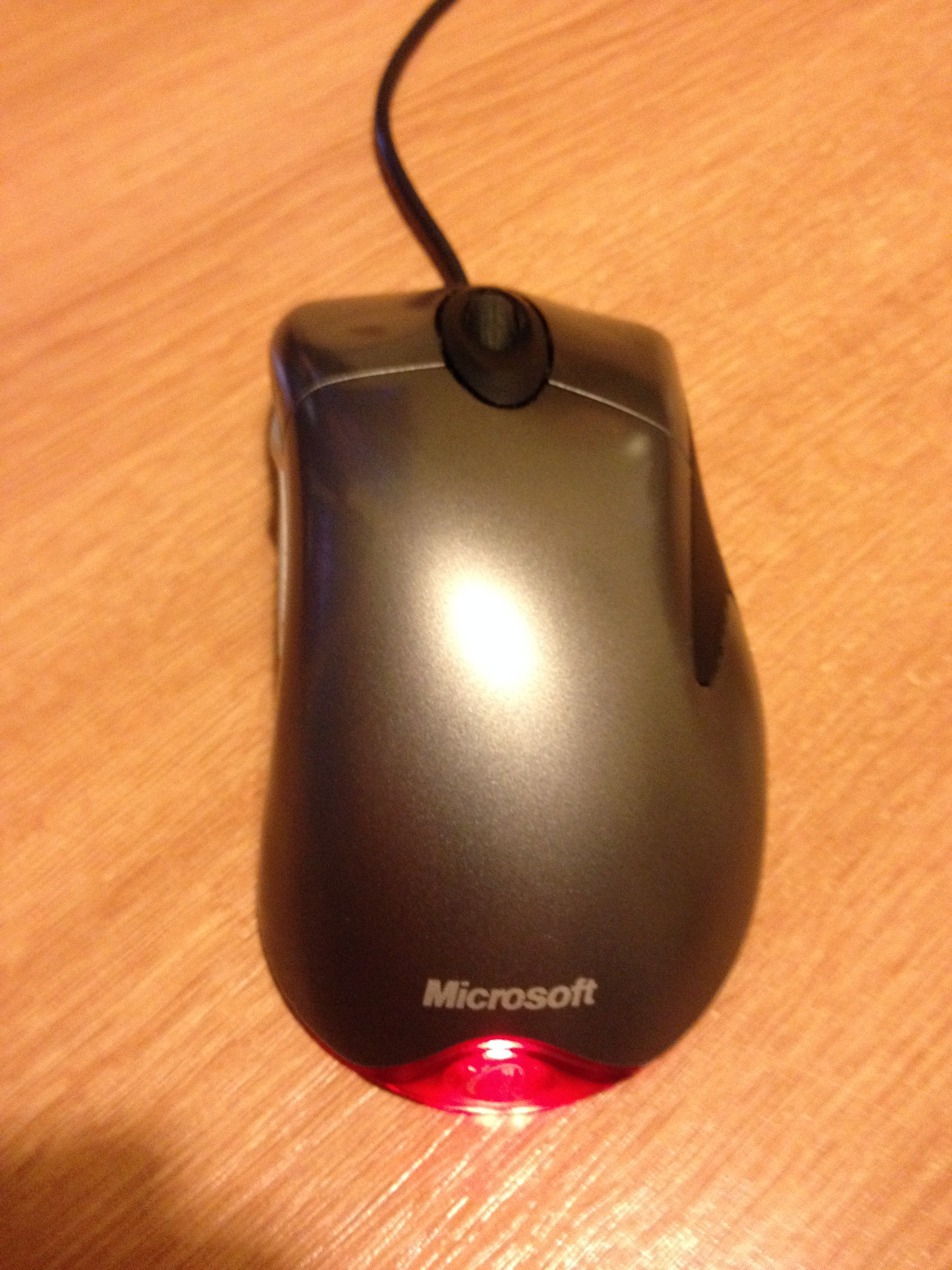
IntelliMouse Explorer 3.0

New versions of the IntelliMouse Explorer were introduced in September 2001. While the original IntelliEye sensor sampled images at 1500 frames per second (fps), the new version sampled images at 6000 fps. In addition, finger grooves and an enhanced grip were added to the new IntelliMouse Explorer.

The IntelliMouse Explorer was later discontinued to be replaced by a redesigned second generation "tilt wheel" model. However because of criticism and fans of the first generation, especially gamers who liked the previous model, Microsoft brought back the original IntelliMouse Explorer and re-released it as the IntelliMouse Explorer 3.0 in August 2006 with a gaming emphasis, using an upgraded 9000 fps sensor.

=== Wireless IntelliMouse Explorer ===
The first Wireless variant, the Wireless IntelliMouse Explorer, was announced in September 2001 and went on sale for an estimated US$74.95 (equivalent to $136 in 2025). Powered by AA batteries, it operates on the 27 MHz radio frequency. As with the concurrently upgraded wired Explorer, this version also makes use of the newer 6000 fps IntelliEye sensor. The Wireless IntelliMouse Explorer for Bluetooth was released in 2002, both as a separate product and with a wireless keyboard in the Wireless Optical Desktop for Bluetooth bundle.

=== Classic IntelliMouse ===
In October 2017, after a few years of dormancy, Microsoft revived the IntelliMouse series with the Classic IntelliMouse, based on the original IntelliMouse Explorer design and shape but featuring a new dark look and new BlueTrack optical technology, allowing it to be used on glass surfaces. It is capable of a maximum sensitivity of 3,200 DPI, far above the older models, and 4,000 fps.

The Classic IntelliMouse went on sale with an initial price of US$39.99 (equivalent to $53 in 2025).

=== Pro IntelliMouse ===
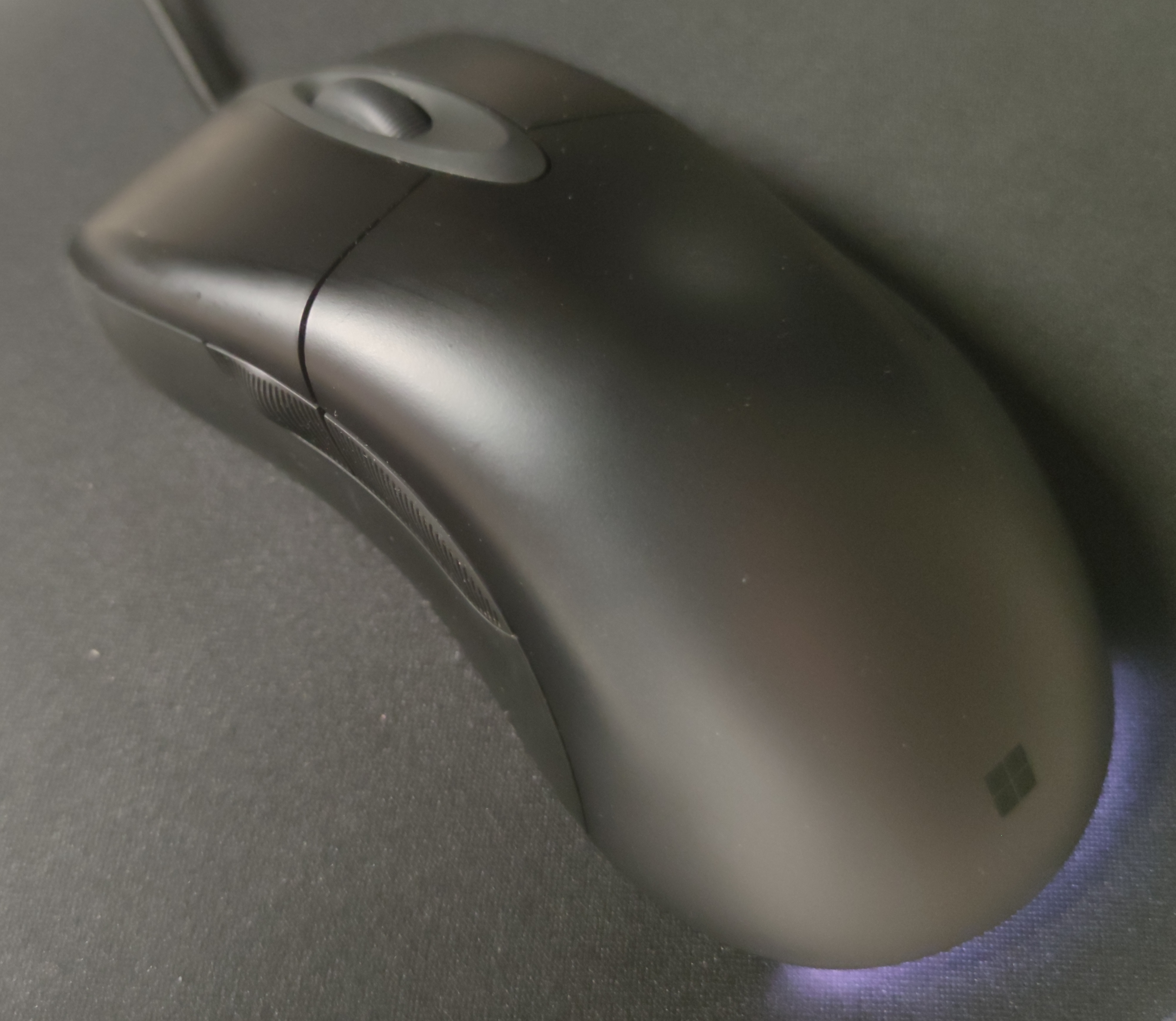
Pro IntelliMouse

In May 2019, Microsoft announced the Pro IntelliMouse, which kept the same Classic IntelliMouse body but replaced the BlueTrack sensor with an upgraded, specialized 16,000 DPI PixArt PAW3389PRO-MS sensor designed for gamers. The sensor is capable of a refresh rate of 12,000 frames per second, more than the 2006 IntelliMouse Explorer 3.0 was capable of. The Pro IntelliMouse went on sale with a price of US$59.99 (equivalent to $76 in 2025).

== IntelliMouse Optical (ambidextrous) ==
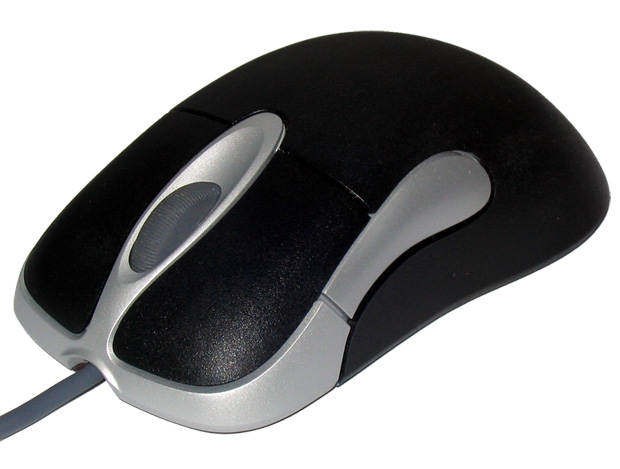
IntelliMouse Optical

The IntelliMouse Optical was announced in January 2000 ahead of its April release with an estimated retail price of US$54.95 (equivalent to $103 in 2025). The IntelliMouse Optical had similar styling and features as the 1999 IntelliMouse Explorer, but used a smaller, symmetric, true ambidextrous design to accommodate use by the left hand.

It has five buttons – the usual two on top plus the scroll wheel, but with one on each side of the mouse (instead of two on the left side as the Explorer). The optical sensor and the plug-and-play USB connection led Microsoft to tout the IntelliMouse Optical as an ideal travel companion for laptop users. An upgraded version was released in 2000 with newer IntelliEye technology. Another upgrade was introduced in September 2001 with newer IntelliEye.

The IntelliMouse Optical received an Industrial Design Excellence Award in 2001, and was included in the "Workspheres" exhibit held at the New York MoMA in 2001.

== IntelliMouse Explorer (tilt wheel) ==
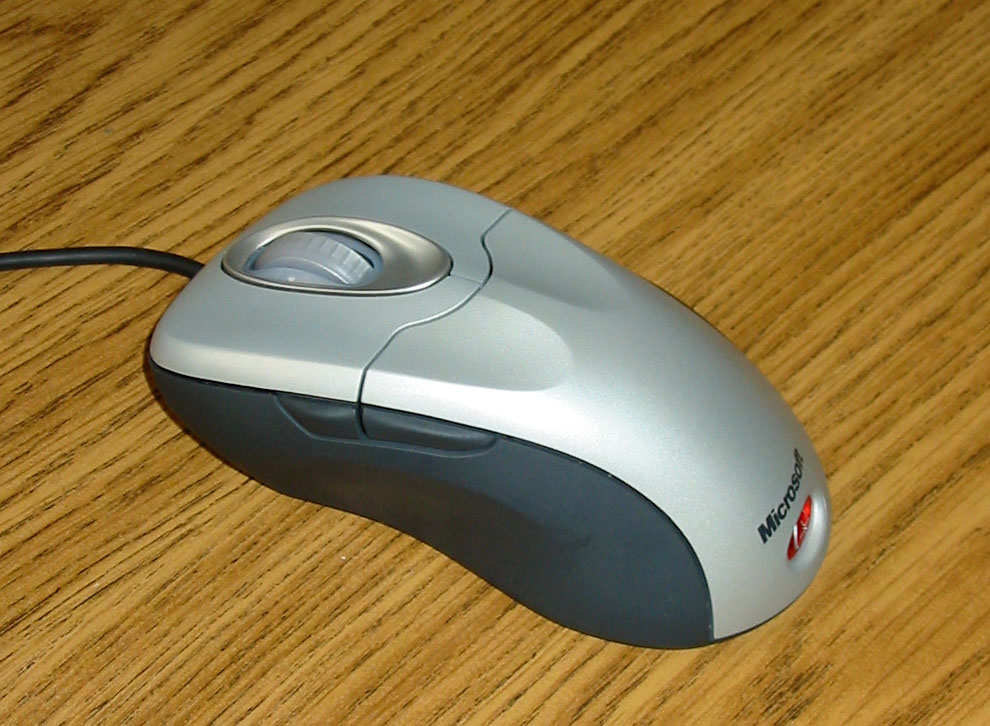
The redesigned IntelliMouse Explorer (wired variant, 4.0a, shown here)

In September 2003, Microsoft introduced a new second generation Explorer mouse model officially named the IntelliMouse Explorer 4.0 (wired variant) and the Wireless IntelliMouse Explorer 2.0 (wireless variant), featuring a tilting scroll wheel to enable horizontal scrolling.

Compared to the original shape Explorer, this new one is rounder, wider and stubbier, with the addition of rubberized plush sides where the thumb rests. The buttons themselves are also smaller sized. The Wireless IntelliMouse Explorer 2.0, like its predecessor, operates on the 27 MHz band.

The wireless Explorer went on sale for about US$54.95 (equivalent to $96 in 2025) while the wired Explorer was released in February 2004 with an estimated price of about US$44.95 (equivalent to $79 in 2025). Two additional finishes, Cobalt Basin and Crimson Fire, were released for the Wireless IntelliMouse Explorer in July 2004.

== See also ==
- Microsoft Mouse
