= Raymond Beausoleil =

Scientist at Hewlett Packard Labs

Raymond G. Beausoleil is an American scientist working at the Hewlett Packard Labs Information and Quantum Systems Laboratory. He was made a fellow of the IEEE in 2023.

== Education ==
Beausoleil received a bachelor's degree in physics from Caltech in 1980. He earned a master's degree in 1984 from Stanford University and went on to receive his PhD in 1986, also from Stanford.

== Career ==
Beausoleil joined HP Labs in 1996, moving to the Quantum Science Research group in 2002. He is now a Senior Fellow, Senior Vice-president and the director of the Large-Scale Integrated Photonics research group. His work with HP includes the invention of optical paper-navigation algorithms used in optical mice and printers. Beausoleil has over 150 patents registered to his name and has contributed to over 600 research papers. Beausoleil is a member of the LIGO Scientific Collaboration and is also adjunct professor of applied physics at Stanford University.

== Awards and honors ==
- Fellow of the American Physical Society.
- Fellow of Optica.
- 2016 Distinguished Lectureship Award on the Applications of Physics from the American Physical Society for "his sustained, groundbreaking work in photonics and optics, especially applied to the integration of optical and electronic computing and information processing".
- In 2023, Beausoleil was elevated to a fellow of the IEEE for "contributions to classical and quantum communication and computation".
