= Bus mouse =

Type of computer mouse

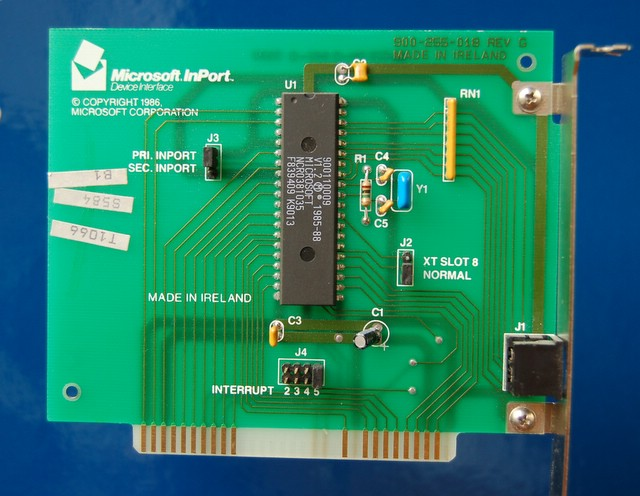
- A Microsoft InPort bus mouse adapter, in the form of an 8-bit ISA (XT-bus) card
- Type: Computer mouse input port

Production history
- Designer: Microsoft
- Designed: late 1980s
- Produced: 1980s to 2000
- Superseded by: PS/2 port, USB (2000; 26 years ago)

General specifications
- External: Yes
- Cable: 9 wires plus shield
- Pins: 9
- Connector: Mini-DIN-9

Data
- Data signal: 30–200 Hz (interrupt mode) with 3 button state signals and quadrature signals for mouse movement

Pinout
- Female port pin layout from the front.
Pin 1	+5 V power	Vcc
Pin 2	XA	X position
Pin 3	XB	X position
Pin 4	YA	Y position
Pin 5	YB	Y position
Pin 6	SW1	Button 1 (Left)
Pin 7	SW2	Button 2 (Middle)
Pin 8	SW3	Button 3 (Right)
Pin 9	GND	Ground
- XA/XB and YA/YB indicate movement and direction based on quadrature phase.

A bus mouse is a variety of PC computer mouse which is attached to the computer using a specialized interface (originally, the Microsoft InPort interface developed for Microsoft's original mouse product).

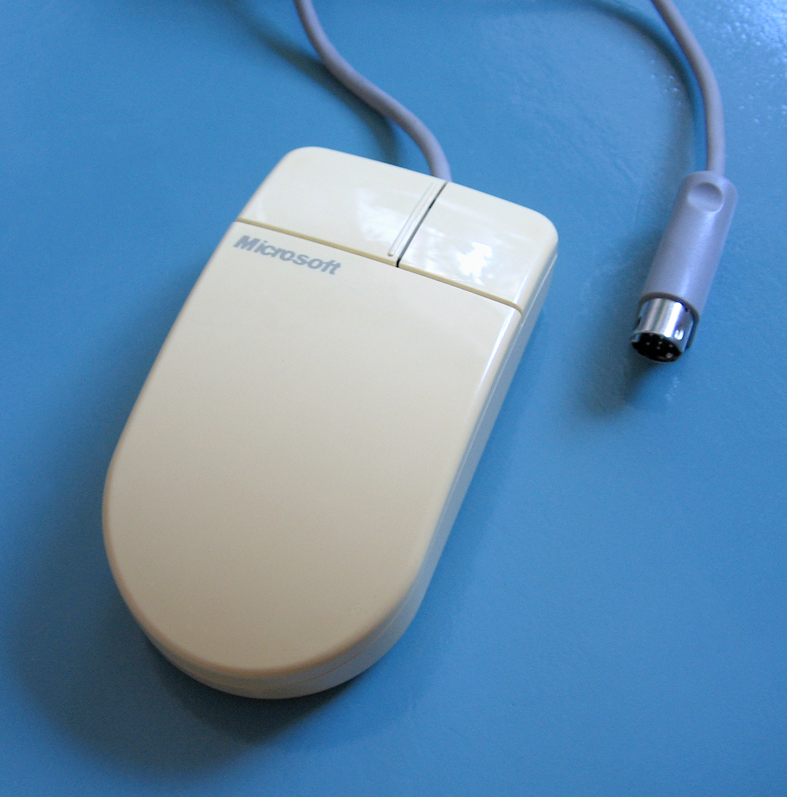
Microsoft InPort™ bus mouse, showing the 9-pin round connector

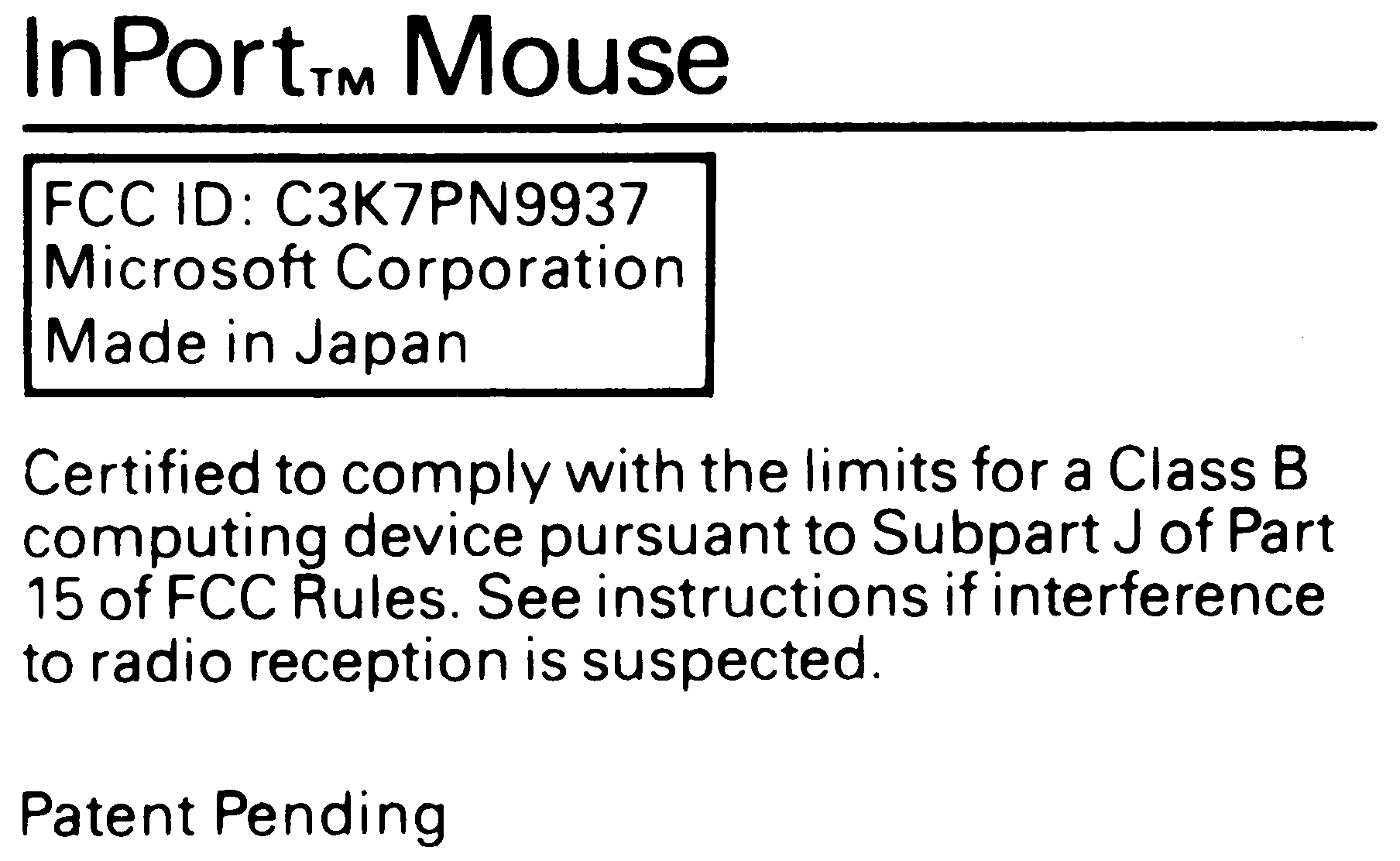
Label on the bottom of a Microsoft InPort™ bus mouse, showing the FCC ID "C3K7PN9937"

In the late 1980s, mice were not integrated with IBM-compatible personal computers, and the specialized bus interface (implemented via an ISA add-in card) was one of two popular ways to connect a mouse; serial interfaces were the other method. In addition to Microsoft, Logitech also made bus mouse interface cards.

When the IBM PS/2 was introduced, it included a motherboard mouse interface which was integrated with the keyboard controller (still called the PS/2 mouse interface long after the PS/2 brand was withdrawn); this fairly quickly drove the bus mouse design out of the marketplace.

The bus mouse lived on in the NEC PC-98 family of personal computers in Japan.

Quadrature bus mice, manufactured by the likes of Atari, Commodore, Logitech and AMX, were supplied or sold, with proprietary wiring, for Atari ST, Commodore Amiga, Acorn BBC Micro, Amstrad CPC, Sinclair ZX Spectrum, and Acorn Archimedes computers.

== See also ==
- BIOS interrupt call
- PS/2 port
- USB
- AMX Mouse – A bus mouse sold for the BBC Micro, Sinclair ZX Spectrum, and Amstrad CPC.
