= Data Access Language =

Data Access Language for the Macintosh, or simply DAL, was a SQL-like language and application programming interface released by Apple Computer in 1990 to provide unified client/server access to database management systems. It was known for poor performance and high costs, something Apple did little to address over its short lifetime, before it was sold off in 1994. DAL is used as the native SQL dialect of the PrimeBase SQL server, as well as the now-defunct Butler SQL.

== History ==
DAL started as a 3rd-party product, CL/1 (Connectivity Language One), from a small vendor, Network Innovations. Apple purchased the company in 1988, during a time that client/server databases were becoming a hot issue in the industry. They released their first version of the re-branded software in 1989, for MVS, and followed with other versions over the next year or so.

DAL suffered from most Apple problems of the early 1990s, notably an alternating level of support in which Apple would aggressively promote the product and then ignore it. Throughout, the company struggled with promoting the system as a cross-platform standard, or as a Mac-only technology. DAL's release was also coincident with Apple's fall from grace in the business world, and not coincidentally with Microsoft's ODBC efforts.

DAL appears to have seen little use, and eventually Apple sold it to Independence Technologies in 1994, during a sell-off of a number of "high-end" packages such as their X.400 server and an SNA client. Independence Technologies was a middleware vendor, better known as a major reseller of the Tuxedo product for Unix. In 1995 BEA Systems bought the company, and in turn sold it to UniPrise Systems in late 1996. No releases took place during this period.

== Description ==
Like Oracle's PL/SQL or Microsoft's Transact-SQL, DAL is essentially an extended version of SQL supporting basic query functionality and adding clean syntax for cursor operations, logic, and loops.

When sent a command, early versions of Apple's DAL interpreter broke down the statement and re-built it into subqueries for the underlying data sources. This translation took place on the server-side, just like PL/SQL and Transact-SQL, but required a fairly expensive "adaptor" program of often dubious performance. This adaptor made DAL considerably less appealing than later systems like ODBC, where the translation normally takes place on the client side and is typically included for free with the database engine. The downside to the ODBC approach is that, theoretically at least, more network bandwidth is used up to pull the "raw data" to the client machine for processing back into a standard format.

On the client end, DAL was originally accessed directly through a system extension (named simply "DAL" in System 7), but it was later rolled into a single ODBC-like driver layer, the Data Access Manager (DAM). DAM was ODBC-like in concept, but did not include the SQL layers, it was strictly a system for sending "opaque" queries and receiving result sets. DAM also included the concept of a "query document" that allowed the DAL (or other) queries to be written in an authoring system and then easily used in any client application.

== Servers and clients ==
One of the more common clients for DAM was HyperCard. The combination of HyperCard and DAL presented a serious challenge to existing vendors who could offer nothing with a GUI. Apple gave a series of demos of HyperCard/DAL, and soon Oracle Corporation purchased a HyperCard-clone, PLUS from Spinnaker Software, to produce Oracle Card.

For much of the 1990s a direct-DAL database server was available on the Macintosh, Butler SQL. However, like any server software on the "classic" Mac OS, Butler was seriously hampered by the Mac's single-user file system and limited multitasking and could never really deliver the sort of performance the same server would have on Windows NT or Unix.

The PrimeBase division of German software developer SNAP Innovation GmbH continues to support DAL in their cross platform SQL database server (originally known as P.INK SQL). Their extended version of DAL is called PrimeBaseTalk (PBT) and is fully backward compatible with DAL. Their architecture does not include Data Access Manager and the resulting performance gains are considerable.

IBM made available a DAL Server for the AS/400 platform in 1995.
