= Revolution (software platform) =

Revolution is a software development environment/multimedia authoring software in the tradition of HyperCard and is based on the MetaCard engine. Its primary focus is on providing a relatively accessible development tool set and scripting language that enable the creation of software programs that run across multiple platforms with little or no code modifications. The Integrated Development Environment (IDE) included with Revolution is built partly on the models created by Bill Atkinson and the original HyperCard team at Apple and subsequently followed by many other software development products, such as Microsoft's Visual Basic. Revolution includes an English language-like scripting language called Transcript, a full programming language superset of the HyperCard's scripting language, HyperTalk.

The higher-grade versions (see Versions, below), allow applications to be compiled to run on more than one platform, including Macintosh (Classic or Mac OS 9, and Mac OS X), Windows and Unix-like systems including Linux. It can also import HyperCard stacks, which require little or no modification unless they use external functions, which generally do not work in Revolution.

Revolution is designed to be an environment where non-programmers feel at ease and programmers feel not too uncomfortable (after getting used to "non-traditional" programming syntax). Like any programming language or development environment, opinions as to the degree to which those aims have been achieved vary greatly.

== Versions ==
Before Revolution 2, the "Starter Kit" version was available. This was freeware and imposed restrictions on the user, such as not allowing scripts longer than ten lines to be compiled. However, this has since been discontinued and is no longer available for download. The "Dreamcard" version is intended for home users/hobbyists. Applications (called "stacks") built using it require either the "Dreamcard Player" or a full copy of Revolution to run because Dreamcard does not include the Revolution compiler. The "Studio" version is more powerful, and is useful in creating professional binary applications. The Enterprise version is probably too expensive for casual users, but when compared to other similar products such as Borland Delphi or Kylix, is priced competitively. If one wishes to develop programs on non-Microsoft platforms for cross-platform deployment, Revolution is one of a small handful of commercially supported options.

== Compatibility ==
Revolution is derived from MetaCard's engine, so MetaCard stacks are 100% compatible with Revolution. However, the other way around is not necessarily true. HyperCard stacks can be run, but externals will only run on Macs. SuperCard stacks must be run through a converter to be upgraded to Revolution/MetaCard format.

== Platforms ==
Revolution runs on Mac Classic, Mac OS X, Windows 9x/NT/2000/XP, and the following UNIX variants:

- FreeBSD or BSD/OS
- HP-UX 10.20 or later
- SGI IRIX 5.3 or later
- Linux Intel 1.2.13 ELF or later
- AIX 3.2.3 or later
- Solaris (2.5 or later for SPARC and x86; 2.3 and 2.4 SPARC only)
- SunOS 4.1.x or later

Standalone applications written in Revolution can run on the above, as well as Windows 3.1 (with limitations).

As of March 2005, the Dreamcard Player runs only on Windows, Mac OS (Classic or X), and Linux.

== Interface ==
On Linux, the user's GNOME/Xfce/GTK+ theme will be used if GTK+ is installed, otherwise, a Motif look will be used. On the Mac, Appearance Manager will be used if available, otherwise the Platinum look will be used. On Windows, the XP theme or standard widgets will be used. Users can preview the Motif, Platinum, and Windows appearance on any platform.

== Revolution community ==
There are many companies and groups which use the Revolution engine. It is mainly used by freelance programmers to make small widgets or libraries, but as one example is used exclusively by the Christa McAuliffe Space Education Center.
