= Sk8 =

Sk8 or SK8 may refer to:

- SK8 (programming language), multimedia authoring software
- SK8-TV, a TV series that aired on Nickelodeon in 1990
- Sk8 (TV series), a TV series that aired on NBC from 2001 to 2002
- SK8 the Infinity, an anime television series that aired in early 2021
- "Sk8", a song by JID, Ciara, and EarthGang from the 2025 album God Does Like Ugly
- Shorthand for skate
