= List of HyperCard viruses =

Computer viruses that target HyperCard

Soon after the release of HyperCard in 1987, computer viruses appeared that targeted the application. The viruses were written in the HyperTalk programming language and typically spread by infecting the Home stack and then infecting other stacks from there.

== List of viruses ==
Name of Virus	Year discovered	Notes
Dukakis	1988	First known HyperCard virus. Self-destructs after displaying a message encouraging people to vote for Michael Dukakis.
3 Tunes (or HC)	1991	First reported from Holland and Belgium. On systems running the German Mac OS, the virus causes infected stacks to play three German folk tunes.
MerryXmas	1991	Intended to simply propagate, but because of an error, the virus sometimes copies parts of other stack scripts along with its own code causing stacks to behave unexpectedly. Variants include Merry2Xmas, Lopez, and Crudshot.
HC 9507	1995	Causes the word "Pickle" to be typed at the cursor insertion point. May also cause the computer to crash.
Antibody	1997	Eradicates the MerryXmas virus and installs MerryXmas inoculation code into infected stacks.
Independance Day	1997	After July 4, 1997, unsuccessfully attempts to delete random lines of code from stacks.
Blink	1998	After January 1, 1999, causes infected stacks to blink.
Wormcode	2000	Originally posted to the usenet group "comp.sys.mac.hypercard" in a stack called "Font Preview". Aside from spreading, the virus does no damage.
