= Zoomracks =

Database management system

Zoomracks was a shareware database management system for the Atari ST and IBM PC that used a card-file metaphor for displaying and manipulating data. Its main claim to fame was an early and somewhat contentious software patent lawsuit filed against Apple Computer's HyperCard and similar products.

Zoomracks, introduced in 1985, represented data in a form that was visually represented by filing cards, known as "QUICKCARD"s. Cards could be designed within the program as "templates", using general-purpose data fields known as "FIELDSCROLL"s, which could hold up to 250 lines of 80 characters. Cards were collected into a "RACK", which was essentially a single database file. The display was character-based and did not make use of the Atari's GEM interface even though this was the primary platform for the product. Unlike similar database programs of the era, Zoomracks did not support different types of data internally; everything was represented as text.

When a rack was opened the cards were displayed as if they were in a sort of linear rolodex, and the user could "zoom in", non-graphically, on any particular area to see more details of the cards in that area, and then zoom in again to see all of the fields on a particular card. The racks could display their cards sorted in a variety of ways, making navigation much easier than with a real-world rolodex, which is sorted only by a single pre-defined index (normally last name). Data could be moved from database to database simply by cutting a card out of one stack and pasting it into another. Up to nine racks could be opened at one time.

Zoomracks II, introduced in 1987, added support for report generation and some basic mathematics. In order to extract a certain subset of the information in a rack and lay it out for printing, the original Zoomracks required the user to cut and paste the desired cards into a new rack. In Zoomracks II a report (possibly only one per rack?) could be defined, laid out as needed complete with headers and footers.

Zoomracks II also added a rudimentary "macro" system that allowed the user to assign a series of commands to a letter on the keyboard. A series of programming commands could be added by the user to the resulting macros, including basic loops, if/then and data input. Macros were physically stored as cards in a separate rack, and could be used "against" any other rack, although the usefulness of this seems questionable (since code is generally tightly bound to the data it works on).

Zoomracks was well received and won "Best Database" by Compute! magazine in January 1989. This does not appear to have translated into widespread use or sales, however, although much of this is likely due to Atari's deteriorating sales in the late 1980s.

Zoomracks' author, Paul Heckel (formerly of Xerox PARC), received US Patent #4486857 for "Display system for the suppression and regeneration of characters in a series of fields in a stored record", describing the basic on-screen operation of the system. After allegedly attempting to license it for some time, in 1988 he filed a series of lawsuits against Apple (HyperCard), Asymetrix (makers of the HyperCard clone ToolBook), IBM (who used ToolBook) and others, as well as offering licenses to end-users of these products in case their uses infringed. Zoomracks itself seems to have disappeared, even by this point in time, and many commented on the lawsuit as a way to make money off a "dead" product, a theme that is very common today.
