= Supercard (disambiguation) =

A supercard, in combat sports, is a card containing multiple high-level matches.

Supercard may also refer to:

- SuperCard, a development environment for Mac OS
- WWE SuperCard, a mobile game
