= Livecode =

Live coding is the use of interactive programming in the arts.

Livecode may also refer to:

- LiveCode, a commercial cross-platform rapid application development language inspired by HyperTalk
- LiveCode (company), a computer software company
