= Advanced Technology Group =

Advanced Technology Group may refer to:

- Advanced Technology Group (Apple), a former division of Apple Computer
- Advanced Technology Group (Novell), a former division of Novell
