= Skating =

Skating involves any sports or recreational activity which consists of traveling on surfaces or on ice using skates, and may refer to:

== Ice skating ==
- Ice skating, moving on ice by using ice skates
  - Figure skating, a sport in which individuals, duos, or groups perform on figure skates on ice
    - Synchronized skating, a sport where between eight and sixteen perform together as a team
  - Speed skating, a competitive form of ice skating in which the competitors race each other in traveling a certain distance on skates
    - Short-track speed skating, a form of competitive ice speed skating
  - Tour skating, a sport and recreational form of long distance ice skating on natural ice

== Other hard surfaces ==
- Roller skating, the traveling on surfaces with roller skates
  - Inline skating, traveling on surfaces with skates having one line of wheels
    - Freestyle slalom skating, a field of inline skating that involves performing tricks around a straight line of equally spaced cones
    - Vert skating, riding inline skates on a vert ramp
    - Aggressive inline skating, inline skating executed on specially designed inline skates with focus on grinding and spins
    - Inline speed skating, the roller sport of racing on inline skates
  - Artistic roller skating, a sport similar to figure skating but where contestants run on roller skates instead of ice skates
  - Road skating
- Skateboarding, an action sport which involves riding and performing tricks using a skateboard

== Snow ==
- Snow skating, using a hybrid of a skateboard and a snowboard on snow

== See also ==
- Outline of sports
- Skate (disambiguation)
- Skating rink (disambiguation)
- Skater (disambiguation)
- Skating system
- Skating techniques
