= Skate =

Skate or Skates may refer to:

== Fish ==
- Skate (fish), several genera of fish belonging to the family Rajidae
- Pygmy skates, several genera of fish belonging to the family Gurgesiellidae
- Smooth skates or leg skates, several genera of fish belonging to the family Anacanthobatidae
- Softnose skates, several genera of fish belonging to the family Arhynchobatidae

== Sports ==
- Ice skate
- Figure skate
- Inline skates
- Roller skates
- Skateboard
- Skate-skiing, a cross-country skiing technique
- Oakland Skates, former professional roller hockey team

== Ships ==
- Skate (dinghy), national small sailboat class unique to Australia
- HMS Skate (1895), a Victorian era destroyer of the United Kingdom
- HMS Skate (1917), an R-class destroyer in commission from 1917 to 1947
- USS Skate, several submarines of the US Navy

== People ==
- Skates (surname)

== Other ==
- Skate of Marrister, Shetland
- Skate (series), an extreme sports video game series
  - Skate (2007 video game), the first game in the series
  - Skate (2025 video game), the fourth game in the series
- SKATE or Game of Skate, a skateboarding game
- Skates!, a book by Ezra Jack Keats
- ZTE Skate, an Android-based smartphone
- Skate, the code name for the October 1944 Bombing of Braunschweig
- "Skate" (song), a song by American superduo Silk Sonic
- "Skate", a remix of the song "Float" by Tim and the Glory Boys
- Skate punk, a subgenre of punk rock

== See also ==
- Skater (disambiguation)
- Skating (disambiguation)
- SK8 (programming language), a multimedia environment developed by Apple
- Sk8 (TV series), an American television series that aired in 2001
- SK8-TV, an American television series that aired in 1990
- wheelskate, a device used to lift a vehicle with wheel damage to move it to a depot
