= PBDS =

PBDS or PBDs or Pbds may refer to:

== Organizations ==
- Parti Bansa Dayak Sarawak, a Malaysian defunct political party formed in 1983 and dissolved in 2004.
- Parti Bansa Dayak Sarawak Baru, a Malaysian political party formed in 2013.

== Other uses ==
- PrimeBase PrimeBase SQL Data Server, a SQL database server developed and maintained by PrimeBase Systems GmbH of Germany.
- Peroxisome biogenesis disorders, autosomal recessive developmental brain disorders that caused by defects in peroxisome functions also result in skeletal and craniofacial dysmorphism, liver dysfunction, progressive sensorineural hearing loss and retinopathy.
