= Butler SQL =

Butler SQL is a now-defunct SQL-based database server for the classic Mac OS released by Canadian developer EveryWare Development in 1992. For much of its history, it was partnered with another EveryWare product, Tango (released 1995), that built dynamic database pages from SQL data. Butler SQL ceased development when Pervasive Software acquired EveryWare in 1998; Tango was sold by Pervasive to Australian firm Witango Technologies in 2001 and renamed to Witango, then subsequently acquired by Tronics Software in 2010 and renamed to TeraScript.

Butler was introduced to take advantage of new a Mac OS component known as the Data Access Manager (DAM), which was similar in concept to ODBC, allowing end-user client programs to access various data sources. DAM, however, worked at a lower level than ODBC and did not contain any inherent query language. To address the concern that a single DAM program might want to work with different back-end databases, Apple used a second system known as the Data Access Language (DAL), which was a variant of SQL that included additional flow-control and data manipulation instructions. DAL queries were converted to the target database using an adaptor on the server.

Butler was written to natively support DAL as its variant of SQL, and use DAM internally to support networking. As such, it avoided several intermediary layers that would be required to use the same queries on other database servers. Butler 2.0, released in May 1996, added direct ODBC links as well.

Butler suffered from performance problems due to the single-user nature of the Mac OS. In particular, file access was single-threaded and multitasking was coordinated by the applications, not the operating system.

== Reception ==
A 1996 Macworld review of web-publishing tools highlighted Butler SQL as the only Web-enabled SQL database available for Macintosh. The review called the Butler-Tango suite useful for small databases but "cumbersome for building and managing large databases containing many tables, largely due to the tools' inability to display relationships between tables graphically."
