= Skater =

Skater may refer to:

== Sports ==
- Someone who practices skateboarding
- Someone who practices roller skating
- Someone who practices inline skating
- Someone who practices ice skating
- An ice hockey player who is not a goaltender
- Skater (subculture), a subculture involving skateboarding

== Arts and entertainment ==
- Skater (band), a Slovenian dance music trio
- Skaters (band), a New York rock band
- The Skaters (band), a Californian experimental music duo
- The Skater, a 1782 painting by Gilbert Stuart
- "The Skaters", a 1964 poem by John Ashbery
- "Skaters" (Frank Stubbs Promotes), a 1993 television episode

== Other uses ==
- Gerridae, a family of insects in the order Hemiptera, commonly known as water skater or pond skater

== See also ==
- Les Patineurs (disambiguation)
- Skate (disambiguation)
- Skating (disambiguation)
