= Skates (surname) =

Skates is a surname. Notable people with the surname include:

- John Ray Skates (born 1934), American historian
- Ken Skates (born 1976), Welsh politician
- Rat Skates (born 1961), American filmmaker
