= Eggplant Software =

Automated software testing company, and its products

Eggplant Software, Inc.
- Genre: Test automation
- Founded: 2002
- Fate: Acquired by Keysight Technologies in June 2020
- Headquarters: London, England; Boulder, Colorado
- Area served: Worldwide
- Products: SenseTalk, Eggplant Functional, Eggplant Performance, Eggplant Test Studio, Digital Automation Intelligence, Eggplant Monitoring, Real Customer Insights
- Owner: Keysight Technologies
- Website: www.keysight.com/us/en/cmp/2023/eggplant-test-automation.html

Eggplant Software, Inc. was a software testing and monitoring company headquartered in London, England, with offices in Boulder, Colorado, Philadelphia, and Berlin. The company developed automated testing tools that interacted with software through its user interface rather than via APIs or code injection, allowing tests to be run across a range of platforms without access to the underlying source code. Keysight Technologies acquired Eggplant in June 2020 for $330 million.

== Products ==
Eggplant's products covered automated functional testing, performance testing, robotic process automation (RPA), and performance monitoring including both real-user and synthetic monitoring. The core Eggplant Functional product was built on the SenseTalk scripting language and used image recognition to interact with on-screen elements, allowing it to test any application regardless of the underlying technology. These products were grouped under the Digital Automation Intelligence (DAI) suite.

== History ==
The Eggplant test automation product was originally developed from 2002 by Redstone Software, a subsidiary of Gresham Computing. In 2008, the Eggplant software and the associated SenseTalk scripting language were acquired by a group of investors who established a new company called TestPlant to continue developing and selling the product.

On 28 March 2018, TestPlant rebranded as Eggplant following its acquisition of NCC Group's Web Performance Division.

On 25 June 2020, Eggplant was acquired by Keysight Technologies for $330 million from the Carlyle Group.
