= Wizzy Active Lifestyle Telephone =

Prototype Apple phone

The Wizzy Active Lifestyle Telephone (W.A.L.T.) was a prototype "phone companion" created by Apple Computer in collaboration with BellSouth. W.A.L.T. featured "touchscreen, send/receive fax functionality, on-display caller ID, a built-in address book, customizable ringtones, and online banking access". The system was based on the PowerBook 100, and included touchscreen, stylus, and handwriting recognition. The operating system was based on System 6 with a HyperCard GUI. Announced in 1993, the system was not mass-produced. A prototype machine was sold on eBay in 2012 for US$8,000. In 2019 a video demonstration of a prototype machine was uploaded to the internet.
