= Skating rink =

Skating rink may refer to:

- Ice rink, a surface of ice used for ice skating
- Roller rink, a surface used for roller skating
- Skating Rink, a 1922 symphonie chorégraphique by Honegger
- The Skating Rink, a 1993 novel by Roberto Bolaño
- The Skating Rink (opera), a 2018 opera, adapted from Bolaño's novel, by David Sawer

== See also ==
- Rink (disambiguation)
- Skate (disambiguation)
