= Les Patineurs =

Les Patineurs (French, literally The Skaters) may refer to:

- Les Patineurs (ballet), a ballet arranged by Constant Lambert from music by Giacomo Meyerbeer
- Les Patineurs (waltz), a waltz by Émile Waldteufel

== See also ==
- Skater (disambiguation)
