= Apple Advanced Technology Group =

Corporate research laboratory at Apple Computer (1986–1997)

Coordinates: 37.3216°N 122.0306°W

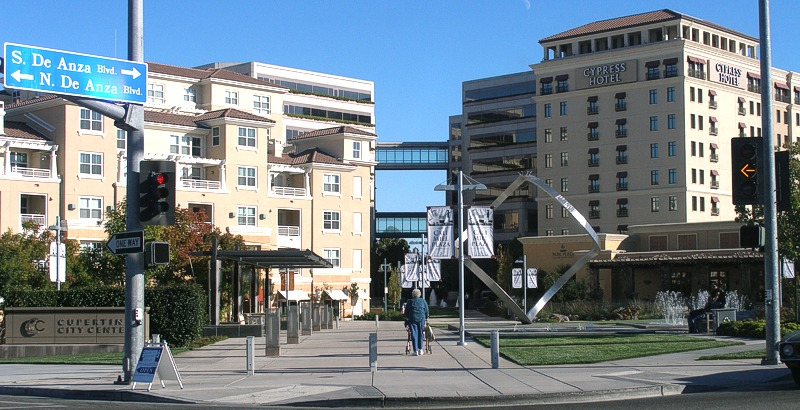
Apple ATG offices in Cupertino City Center buildings

The Advanced Technology Group (ATG) was a corporate research laboratory at Apple Computer from 1986 to 1997. ATG was an evolution of Apple's Education Research Group (ERG) and was started by Larry Tesler in October 1986 to study long-term research into future technologies that were beyond the time frame or organizational scope of any individual product group. Over the next decade, it was led by David Nagel, Richard LeFaivre, and Donald Norman. It was known as Apple Research Labs during Norman's tenure as VP of the organization. Steve Jobs closed the group when he returned to Apple in 1997.

ATG had research efforts in both hardware and software, with groups focused on such areas as Human-Computer Interaction, Speech Recognition (by Kai-Fu Lee), Educational Technology, Networking, Information Access, Distributed Operating systems, Collaborative Computing, Computer Graphics, and Language/action perspective. Many of these efforts are described in a special issue of the ACM SIGCHI Bulletin which provided a retrospective of the ATG work after the lab was shut down. ATG was also home to four Apple Fellows: Al Alcorn, object-oriented software pioneer; Alan Kay; Bill Atkinson; Donald Norman; and laser printer inventor Gary Starkweather. Further, ATG funded university research and, starting in 1992, held an annual design competition for teams of students.

Apple's ATG was the birthplace of Color QuickDraw, QuickTime, QuickTime VR, QuickDraw 3D, QuickRing, 3DMF the 3D metafile graphics format, ColorSync, HyperCard, Apple events, SK8, AppleScript, Apple's PlainTalk speech recognition software, the 1986 Möbius ARM based computer prototype, Apple Data Detectors, the V-Twin software for indexing, storing, and searching text documents, Macintalk Pro Speech Synthesis, the Newton handwriting recognizer, the component software technology leading to OpenDoc, MCF, HotSauce, Squeak, and the children's programming environment Cocoa (a trademark Apple later reused for its otherwise unrelated Cocoa application frameworks).
