= HyperStudio =

Interactive multimedia presentation authoring tool

HyperStudio is a creativity tool software program distributed by Software MacKiev. It was originally created by Roger Wagner in 1989 as "HyperStudio 1.0 for the Apple IIGS", later versions introduced support for Mac and Windows.

It can be described as a multimedia authoring tool, and it provides relatively simple methods for combining varied media. It has been available for purchase off and on over the years, and is now being marketed by Software MacKiev as "Version 5.1", which is aimed mostly at an educational market.
