= USS Skate =

Three submarines of the United States Navy have borne the name USS Skate, named for a type of ray.

- The first USS Skate (SS-23) was a United States F-class submarine that sank in March 1915 off Pearl Harbor.
- The second USS Skate (SS-305) was a Balao-class submarine that saw action in World War II.
- The third USS Skate (SSN-578), the lead ship of her class of nuclear attack submarines, saw action during the Cold War.
