= MetaCard =

MetaCard is a discontinued cross-platform, commercial HyperCard clone. MetaCard included an IDE, a GUI toolkit and had its own language, MetaTalk. From the MetaCard Corporation website: "The MetaTalk language has all the features common to third-generation languages like C/C++/Java but has a much simpler syntax."

Cross Worlds Computing developed applications on the MetaCard platform (e.g., Ten Thumbs Typing Tutor) and developed their own MetaCard IDE called Revolution. They agreed to take over MetaCard development adding the language and runtime to Revolution and changed their name to Runtime Revolution (RunRev). RunRev did not adapt the original MetaCard IDE and it was made available as free and open-source software via a Yahoo! group and a RunRev hosted mailing list. Runtime Revolution changed the name of Revolution to LiveCode and then changed their name to LiveCode, Ltd. as well.
