= SuperCard =

Programming software

- Developer: Solutions Etcetera
- Stable release: 4.8.1 / Feb 27, 2020
- Operating system: System Software 6, System 7, Mac OS 8, Mac OS 9, Mac OS X
- Type: hypermedia, development
- License: Proprietary
- Website: supercard.us at the Wayback Machine (archived 2002-07-21)

SuperCard is a discontinued high-level development environment that ran on Macintosh computers, under OS 8 and 9, and OS X. It was inspired by HyperCard, but included a richer language, a full GUI toolkit, and native color (as opposed to HyperCard's Apple- or third-party-supplied add-ons).

The programming language used by SuperCard was called SuperTalk, and was largely based on HyperTalk, the language in HyperCard. In addition to the core language, SuperTalk could call out to OSA-based scripting languages such as AppleScript, and shell commands. The language could be extended with so-called externals, chunks of compiled code that appeared like native routines.

Programs created using SuperCard could be run inside the IDE itself, or as "standalones", which combined the user-created programs and resources with the execution engine used by SuperCard.

== History ==
=== The early years ===
SuperCard was first created by Bill Appleton and published by Silicon Beach Software in 1989. Appleton combined elements from World Builder (that he wrote), HyperCard, SuperPaint (Macintosh) and the Macintosh user interface.

In 1990, Silicon Beach was acquired by Aldus Corporation. Aldus released version 1.6 of SuperCard which brought support for AppleEvents, enhanced graphic capabilities and several other improvements.

=== Mid-1990s ===
In February 1994, Allegiant Technologies of San Diego bought SuperCard. Allegiant released several versions of the software, and even won the 1995 MacUser Editor's Choice for Best New Multimedia-Authoring Application. Version 1.7 of SuperCard, which was released in June 1994, included several important enhancements, including QuickTime support and switch statements. In December of the same year, version 2.0 was released. This was the first PowerPC native version, which made it a lot faster than previous versions on newer machines. Also, this version introduced an application called Standalone Maker, which put a front end on the ability to edit the resource fork of executable SuperCard projects. SuperCard had always been able to produce stand alone executable applications, but this tool lowered the barrier to entry for novice users. Version 2.0 and 2.5 were released in Japanese-language versions. Version 2.5 also added full 24-bit color, and QuickTime VR support.

=== Late 1990s ===
Several versions of SuperCard were released thereafter, that included features such as support for full 24-bit color and improvements of the filmstrip feature. In early 1996, a new companion product called Marionet was released. This add-on allowed projects to communicate over local networks or the Internet, offering server-side functionality and foreshadowing the robust web application era of today.

Twenty months later, the third version of SuperCard was released. This new version sported a new project file format supporting user properties, and a completely new Project Editor.

Allegiant's goal was to keep innovating on the Macintosh product, while delivering a Windows runtime environment (edit on the Mac, run on Windows or Mac) and ultimately a Windows authoring environment. The firm went through three different attempts to bring a Windows version of SuperCard to the public. The first was a true "port" of the product (which would have included both editing and runtime environments on Windows), but it was taking too long and was very unstable due to the lack of a robust graphical "toolbox" such as the one offered on the Mac platform. It was determined that it would be unfeasible to use the Macintosh source code as a basis for porting to Windows at the time, so a second was an attempt to make a runtime-only environment that supported most of the capabilities of SuperCard, but under a brand new code base that was written from the ground up with new engineers. This version was more stable, but ultimately did not make it to market (although it formed the basis for the Roadster plugin (see below)). The third attempt was very short-lived, but was based on conversations with Apple related to QuickTime Interactive (QTi), which was going to provide a Quicktime-based environment that could be used to create a Quicktime-based development and authoring tool using the SuperTalk language.

Ultimately, the firm also created a SuperCard browser plugin called "Roadster" in 1996 to run "projects" — the SuperCard version of stacks. Roadster supported a subset of SuperCard's capabilities, but since it was a web plugin, it was the first time that SuperCard content could be played on Windows.

In May 1998, Incwell DMG acquired SuperCard and all related products from Allegiant. Shortly thereafter, version 3.5 was announced. This version, which was finally released in October 1998, was faster than its predecessors, and had support for QuickTime 3, Drag and Drop, and more. Incwell also cut the price in half compared to previous versions.

Version 3.6, released in 1999, brought a Japanese version and many internal improvements.

=== The 21st century ===
In 2002, SuperCard was acquired for the fourth time. This time, Solutions Etcetera, the company that had been developing SuperCard for IncWell, bought the product, and announced version 4. This new version introduced Mac OS X support, complete theme compliance and a wide range of user interface elements to go with it.

Versions up to 4.8 were released, bringing improvements and bug fixes, native support for Apple's Intel-Chip-Based Macs, IDE enhancements, extended numeric precision, anti-aliased draw graphics, and expanded shell support.

As of March 2023, SuperCard 4.8.1 was not compatible with macOS Catalina or later due to the removal of 32-bit application support in macOS.

As a result of the death of Scott Simon, co-owner of Solutions Etcetera, in April 2024, the SuperCard web site and that of its parent company were taken down. This brought to an end the 36-year history of the product. The clear turning point in SuperCard's commercial viability was Solutions Etcetera's decision not to follow Apple's development roadmap. After MacOS dropped support for 32-bit applications in 2012 (OS X Mountain Lion), SuperCard could only be run on obsolete hardware (defined as officially unsupported by Apple), or under emulated environments on modern hardware. This, combined with the rise of competing, more modern, cross-platform authoring alternatives and frameworks vastly diminished the potential customer base.
