= Skater (band) =

Slovenian band

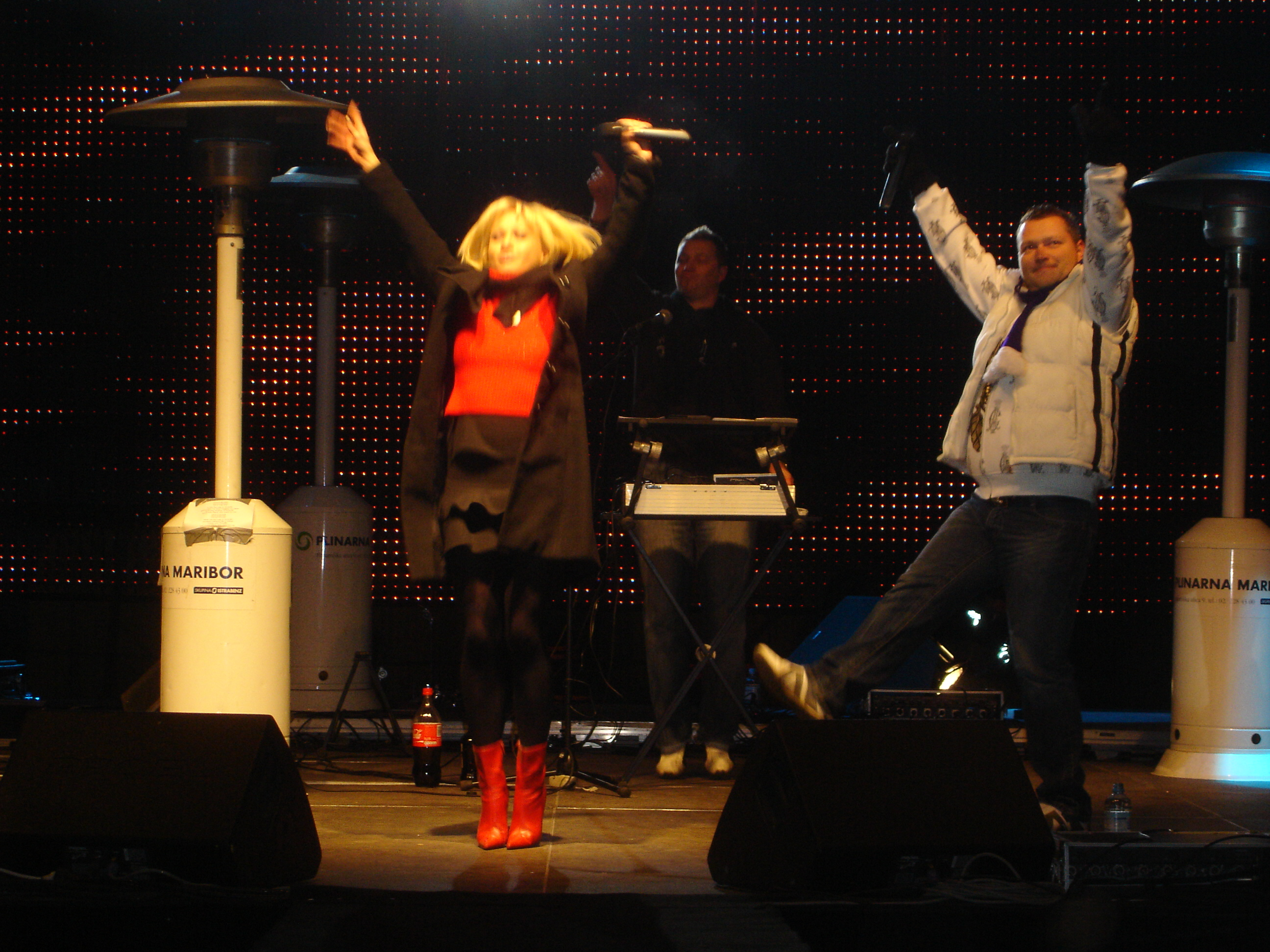
- Skater performing in Maribor on New Year's Eve, 2008–09

Background information
- Also known as: Skuter
- Origin: Slovenia
- Genres: Turbo-folk, dance fusion (subgenre: Eastern European polkatronica)
- Years active: 2003–present
- Labels: Nika Records; Cela Pametna Založba
- Members: Samcy Jay; Saška Smodej
- Past members: Katja Lesjak (2003–2013), Roberto Dee (2003–2013)
- Website: skutermusic.com

Skater (formerly Skuter) is a Slovenian fusion dance music and turbo-folk duo comprising Samcy Jay and Saška Smodej. The band's original name lampoons the German eurodance band Scooter.

== Discography ==
=== Studio albums ===
- Arrivederci (Cela Pametna Založba, 2005) [as Skuter]
- Pridi k meni (Nika Records, 2008)

=== Maxi singles ===
- Arrivederci Vanč (Nika Records, 2005) [as Skuter]

=== Compilation albums ===
- Naredi da... se trese (2006) [as Skuter]
