= ToolBook =

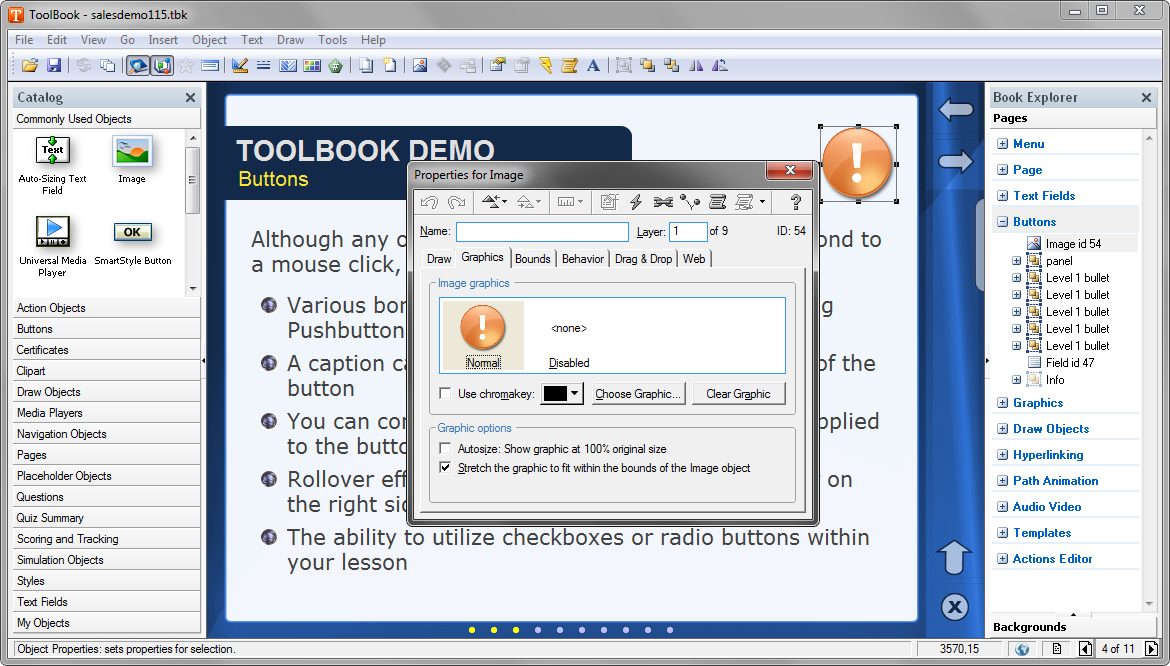
ToolBook user interface

ToolBook was a Microsoft Windows based e-learning content authoring application, initially released in 1990 by Asymetrix Corporation, now SumTotal Systems. ToolBook uses a book metaphor — a project file is thought of as a book containing pages of content. This is very similar to Microsoft PowerPoint’s use of the metaphor where presentations contain various slides. ToolBook was often compared to HyperCard and Visual Basic.

The first version of ToolBook was demonstrated in 1990 episode of The Computer Chronicles, in an episode about Windows 3.0.

The final version of ToolBook was 11.5. It was released in December 2012.

SumTotal Systems ended all sales and support of ToolBook on December 31, 2021. This also ended the ability to Activate ToolBook installations on new computers. All information about ToolBook has been scrubbed from the company website.

Information about ToolBook can still be found on various public websites including the following:

- Platte Canyon
- ToolBook Knowledge Base

== Runtime environments ==
ToolBook allows for the creation of applications and training materials for Windows and/or the web. To support these two distribution models, ToolBook contains two different programming environments:

- OpenScript: ToolBook includes a very capable built-in programming language called OpenScript, which is similar to HyperTalk. OpenScript is object oriented and event-driven, where chunks of programming code are associated to the different elements within the lesson. The OpenScript language only functions within the Native engine of ToolBook. It does not function in DHTML-delivered content.
- Actions Editor: The Actions Editor is another programming environment where the syntax is virtually identical to OpenScript. The biggest difference is that the Actions Editor is not as powerful a language as OpenScript. Whereas OpenScript has over a thousand commands and functions, the Actions Editor contains perhaps 80. However, Actions Editor programming code works equally well within ToolBook (Native) as well as in a web browser (DHTML).

== Features ==
ToolBook’s key features are:

- Catalog - The Catalog is a repository of objects that can be added to your project. For example: Text fields, Buttons, Question Objects, Rectangles, Navigation Controls. You can even add your own objects to the catalog so that they can be used later in different projects.
- Book Explorer - The Book Explorer will display a tree-view breakdown of all objects on a given page.
- PowerPoint Converter - The PowerPoint Add-on (called SumTotal Publish To ToolBook) will allow you to convert a PowerPoint presentation into a ToolBook file. Once installed, you'll find this Add-on within the main Ribbon within PowerPoint.
- Simulation Recorder - The Simulation Recorder will watch and record you interacting with another application, and allow you to import that simulation into ToolBook as an interactive simulation (this is not a video recording).
- Simulation Editor - You can create your own simulations manually or edit/modify a simulation you recorded using the Simulation Recorder. Simulations can be played back in 3 modes: Demonstration (sit back and watch), Practice (provides detailed next-step instruction to user, allowing them to complete the simulation), Assessment (let the user attempt the simulation by themselves).
- Path Animation - Any object in ToolBook can be configured to move (animate) across the page using a simple or even complex path.
- Media Players - ToolBook supports the ability to play Audio and Videos in a wide variety of formats, supported by these 4 media technologies: Windows Media Player, RealPlayer, QuickTime, Flash.
- SCORM/AICC - ToolBook provides SCORM and AICC support within web-published lessons for use in SCORM/AICC compliant Learning Management Systems.
- AutoPackager - In order to distribute a Native lesson or application to a Windows computer (in non-DHTML format), the AutoPackager is used. It has the ability to wrap your lesson into a Windows Installer so an end user can install it onto their computer.
- Quiz - Many question objects (True/False, Multiple-Choice, Match Item, etc.) exist in ToolBook to allow you to create a training lesson. Various scoring behaviors also exist, such as Score This Page (or Range of Pages). Using the Actions Editor, you can design complex navigation within a lesson based on individual question scores.

== Version history ==
Below is an historical list of English versions of ToolBook:

- 1990 ToolBook 1.0
- 1991 ToolBook 1.52, 1.53
- ---- There was never a 2.0 release
- 1994 ToolBook 3.0 and 3.0a

Computer Based Training (CBT) edition released
Allowed for the creation of training lessons
Multimedia edition released
Introduced full media support

- 1995 ToolBook 3.01
- 1996 ToolBook 4.0
- 1996 ToolBook 5.0, 5.01
- 1998 ToolBook 6.0, 6.1, 6.1a

Librarian integration
HTML Frame Support added
Neuron Impulse added
AutoPackager replaces the Setup Manager
InstallShield Express templates
Object Browser added
Page Browser added
Log Reader added

- 1998 ToolBook 6.5

Coach added
Templates feature added
HTML export now offers true object positioning
Neuron's Impulse improved by adding compression abilities

- 1999 ToolBook 7.0
- 1999 ToolBook 7.1

DHTML Export added
Actions Editor added
Universal Media Player added
Lesson Design Specialist added
Agent added to read Coach text

- 2000 ToolBook 7.2
- 2000 ToolBook 8.0

eLN Support added
HTTP Post added to Actions Editor
Array support added to Actions Editor
SCORM and AICC Support added
Catalog completely redesigned

- 2001 ToolBook 8.1

Questions now offer Media feedback
Print command added to Actions Editor
Backup feature added

- 2002 ToolBook 8.5

Simulation support added
DHTML: Export now support encryption & obfuscation
DHTML: Creation of ZIP package file added

- 2003 ToolBook 8.6

Sun JVM now supported
Cross Domain HTTP Post now supported

- 2004 ToolBook 2004 (aka 8.9)

Simulation Recorder added
Action Methods support added
Execute SCORM action added to Actions Editor

- 2004 ToolBook 2004 SP1

Various Simulation enhancements added
Ability to set or clear focus added to Actions Editor

- 2005 ToolBook 2004 SP2

DHTML export no longer relies on JVM
Firefox and Mozilla support added
SCORM 2004 support added
QuickTime support added to the Universal Media Player

- 2005 ToolBook 2004 SP3

Added support to store Actions Editor variables in LMS
TotalLMS catalog objects added

- 2007 ToolBook 9.0

Now a 32 bit product
Introduction of the Book Explorer
Introduction of Smart Styles
Universal Media Player updated to use WMP9 instead of WMP6.4
Textline, Item & Word added to Actions Editor
RGBStroke and Transparent added to Actions Editor
Retired dBase and Pardox database support

- 2007 ToolBook 9.01

Fixed printing issues
Fixed various AutoPackager issues
Fixed UMP (On Media Complete) issue
Fixed centering of text for long word-wrapped question answers
This was the last version of ToolBook Assistant, now retired

- 2008 ToolBook 9.5

License Key product activation technology added
PowerPoint conversion added
TBKX (ToolBook XML) file format introduced
Voice Recording added
PNG image support
Certificate catalog category added
iPhone/iPod touch support, and Safari browser too
Universal Media Player now offers feature to Hide at Reader
Mozilla no longer officially supported
Windows 2000 is no longer supported
Term "Instructor" dropped from product name

- 2009 ToolBook 9.5 Service Pack 1

Fixed sluggish performance caused by Book Explorer
Admin rights no longer needed to publish to DHTML
MSI Installer for IT Groups created
PNG Transparency now works in IE 6

- 2009 ToolBook 10.0

Catalog now matches look of the Book Explorer
Quiz Summary feature added
Match Item Question enhanced to draw smooth lines in DHTML
Image object type added
All Bitmap Resources now stored in native compressed format
Google Android Browser support added
Commonly Used Objects category added to catalog
Ability to designate Question Text for any given question object
Ability to Play/Stop/Pause a voice recording
Universal Media Player now offers a Show Speaker Icon feature
Borderless Scrolling Field added
PowerPoint Converter now converts speaker notes
PowerPoint Converter now converts audio

- 2010 ToolBook 10.0 Patch 1

Fixed: Opening previous version TBK not displaying warning dialog
Fixed: Unable to force a Fill In The Blank question object into focus
Fixed: Unable to create a new catalog
Fixed: Unable to export a catalog category
Fixed: Image Object appears out of position by 1 pixel in DHTML
Fixed: Images within Recordfields missing in DHTML

- 2010 ToolBook 10.5

Geolocation support
Resizable SmartStyles
iPad and Windows Mobile DHTML support
Drag/Drop support added to iPhone
Resized images now utilize a smooth resizing technology
Ctrl-Shift-V pastes unformatted text
Improved support for pasting in Word formatted text

- 2011 ToolBook 10.5 Update 1

Added BlackBerry Mobile Device support

- 2011 ToolBook 11

Startup Dialog replaced with entirely different interface
Question Wizard added
39 New SmartStyles added
Arrows Category added to Catalog
BlackBerry 6 and Chrome 5 support added
Neuron officially retired and pulled from the product
Two Tools Added: Move Pages and Reassign Pages
Two Tools Added: Delete Unused Extensions, Delete Unused Resources
Two Tools Added: Randomization - Configure and Validate
Customize Catalog option added to Edit menu
Draw Objects enhanced to use Antialiasing and true transparency

- 2012 ToolBook 11.5

Overhaul of Publish to Web interface, to simplify DHTML Export
Enhanced logging of errors/problems when Publishing to Web
Improved Resource Manager
Voice Recording enhancements
Various Bullets and Seals added to the Clipart Catalog category
Delete Page utility added
Character Map added
Display Book Information utility introduced
Various right-click menu enhancements
Resource Lookup tool added
Copy/Paste of text now include field images
Discontinued DHTML support for Firefox 2 and IE 6
Use of JS file: Path is now stored as a relative path
