= John Ray Skates =

Mississippi historian (1934–2009)

John Ray Skates Jr. (October 14, 1934 – February 18, 2009) was an American historian in Mississippi. He chaired the history department at the University of Southern Mississippi. He wrote a history of the Mississippi Supreme Court, and his research into the history is held at USM's McCain Library and Archives. He also wrote a book about planning for an invasion of Japan towards the end of World War II arguing it was not the preferred alternative to an atomic bomb attack and that justifying the bombing by setting it against such an invasion as the other alternative is ahistorical.

== Life and career ==
Skates was born in Catchings, Mississippi in Sharkey County on October 14, 1934. In 1956 he married Kathleen Craig Barnwell. He was a colonel in the Army Reserve.

Skates earned his PhD from Mississippi State University where he wrote his thesis on Frederick Sullens and the Jackson Daily News. He continued to publish and his writings were published in journals including: Journal of Military History and Southern Quarterly. He occasionally collaborated with David G. Sansing, another Mississippi historian, whom he'd taught as a grad student.

Skates died in Ocean Springs, Mississippi on February 18, 2009, at the age of 74.

== Books ==
- Mississippi's Present and Past (1973)
- Mississippi: A History (1979)
- Mississippi's Old Capitol: Biography of a Building (1990)
- Invasion of Japan: Alternative to the Bomb (1994).
- A History of the Mississippi Supreme Court, 1817-1948 (1973)
