= PrimeBase =

A number of database related products and projects go under the name of PrimeBase. Classic PrimeBase is a SQL database server developed and maintained by PrimeBase Systems GmbH of Hamburg, Germany. The open source projects "PrimeBase XT Storage Engine for MySQL" (PBXT) and "PrimeBase Media Streaming" engine (PBMS) are supported and funded by PrimeBase Technologies GmbH.

The bulk of the PrimeBase SQL Data Server (PBDS) users are in the print and pre-press industry. This is due to historical reasons and the fact that PBDS features such as efficient BLOB handling and full-text search focus on the requirements of applications in this area. PBDS began life as P.INK SQL in 1990. It was originally developed for the Macintosh by the company P.INK Software Engineering GmbH and Co, in Hamburg. At the time, it was the only SQL server that ran on the Macintosh. In 1992 P.INK Software began porting the database to Unix. In particular, the Sun SPARC workstation and the IBM RS/6000.

The database was used as the central component of the P.INK Press Publishing System, which was installed at a number of major newspapers in Germany and worldwide. Following a number of management errors that saw the company grow too fast P.INK Software declared bankruptcy in 1995 when shareholders were unable to agree on the terms for refinancing the company.

A number of former employees managed to secure the rights to the P.INK SQL database and in 1996 they founded SNAP Innovation GmbH. Support and development of the database was continued under the name of PrimeBase. By the year 2001 SNAP had added related products to the PrimeBase SQL Data Server including the PrimeBase Replication Server and the PrimeBase Application Server. These products are now all owned and maintained by PrimeBase Systems GmbH.

In 2004, SNAP began development of PBXT, the transactional storage engine for MySQL. Drawing on experience gained in the development of the PrimeBase DBMS, SNAP also launched the "Scalable BLOB Streaming Infrastructure for MySQL" project, under which PBMS and the S3 Daemon have been developed. Both of these projects have now been put under the umbrella of the open source company PrimeBase Technologies.
