= Oracle Media Objects =

Oracle Media Objects (OMO)
- OMO Screenshot
- Developer: Oracle
- Stable release: 1.1.2 / 1998 (last date FAQ was updated)
- Operating system: System Software 6, System 7, Mac OS 8, Mac OS 9
- Type: hypermedia, development
- License: Proprietary
- Website: N/A

Oracle Media Objects was a software development environment for creating interactive multi-media applications. Formerly known as Oracle Card, its functionality and appearance were similar to Apple Inc.'s HyperCard.

The program originated as Plus, a 1989 clone of HyperCard published by Format Verlag that added several highly-requested features. Plus was purchased by Spinnaker Software, who ported it to Windows NT and OS/2 Presentation Manager, becoming the first cross-platform hypermedia solution. In 1994, Plus was purchased by ObjectPlus, who focussed on the Windows version, renaming it WinPlus. They also licensed the system to Oracle, who used it as the basis for Oracle Card.

First released in 1991, Oracle Card was essentially a redistribution of the Plus runtime engine along with external libraries for establishing connections to RDBMS engines such as Oracle and DB2. As such, Oracle Card stacks could execute queries and associate their results with native variables, making Oracle Card one of the first RDBMS application development environments to support cross-platform development.

The initial release was important as it was a stop gap measure to allow Oracle to provide support for Microsoft Windows which was rapidly growing in popularity in business. At this time Oracle's core technologies for creating data entry systems (Oracle Forms and Oracle Reports) only ran in text mode such as MS-DOS and terminals and did not provide a GUI interface for Windows. Oracle Card helped to show that Oracle was supporting Windows until it could release its first Oracle Forms 4.0 with improved GUI support for Windows.

A few years later, Oracle acquired the original Plus source code from Format Verlag and developed it to become Oracle Media Objects or OMO. OMO lasted only briefly, with development ceasing after version 1.1.2. OMO was used by Oracle to position itself in the video on demand market. Commercially, there were very few products built using the tool. Amongst these were the "Our Secret Century" series of CD-ROMs published by The Voyager Company, Inside Independence Day by ACES Entertainment and UCAS University Course Search a CD-ROM by Learning Information Systems trading as StudyLink.

== Unique features of OMO ==
OMO had the unique distinction of not only its stacks being cross-platform, but also its external libraries (XCMDs). For that purpose, a small subset of the Mac OS memory management commands (Handles) were ported to other platforms. In addition, OMO sported a modular design where every type of object was actually implemented as a plugin file in an "Objects" folder.

OMO's object types included both the standard controls available in other HyperCard clones of the time (buttons, text fields, draw and paint graphics), as well as more complex controls like a spreadsheet field, and non-control items that could be placed on a card but were invisible at runtime, like timers that could be scheduled to send messages after a specified time.

== Initial competitive impact ==
Oracle Card's primary value lay in the fact that, at the time, it was Oracle's only product to offer GUI support on Microsoft Windows. It was therefore sometimes included in sales pitches to potential clients by virtue of the fact that Windows was becoming increasingly popular on the desktop at large corporations. It showed customers that Oracle was serious about Windows and had a current product for that platform.

Oracle's primary application development tool, Oracle Forms 3, was character-based and did not run under Microsoft Windows (although it could run in a DOS window or natively on DOS without Windows). Oracle was desperately working on developing an upgrade (Oracle Forms 4) that had GUI features, but development was behind schedule. Oracle Card was primarily used as a "stop gap" demonstration product until Oracle Forms become available.

A handful of large clients, including the U.S. Postal Service, were known to have developed applications with Oracle Card for internal use. But Oracle Card had no broad, commercial success as a development platform, despite the fact that its feature set surpassed that of Apple's HyperCard in nearly every respect (platform support, database connectivity, vector graphics support, better color support, faster performance, and a richer plug-in architecture).

Eventually Oracle Forms 4.0 was released, meaning that support for Windows was no longer the exclusive domain of Oracle Card. Because Oracle's customers tended to be more interested in standard, forms-based database applications, rather than in the sorts of multimedia applications that were possible to create with Oracle Card and its successor, OMO, Oracle eventually threw its full weight behind Oracle Forms 4.0, casting Oracle Card/OMO into oblivion. However, the Oracle Card team was led by two Oracle employees who have gone on to form their own, successful, technology companies: Marc Benioff, founder of Salesforce.com, and Evan Goldberg, founder of NetSuite.
