= Awareness Technologies =

American company providing security services

Awareness Technologies, Inc.
- Type: Private Company
- Industry: Software
- Founded: 2002
- Headquarters: Westport, Connecticut, USA
- Key people: Elizabeth Harz (CEO); Mike Osborn (Co-Founder); Ron Penna (Co-Founder)
- Products: Computer and Mobile Device activity monitoring software.
- Number of employees: 32
- Website: www.awarenesstech.com

Awareness Technologies is a Westport, Connecticut-based American technology company founded in 2002. The company provides security, monitoring, forensic, data loss prevention, productivity and analytics solutions for home, office, and enterprise.

== History ==
The company was founded in 2002 in Los Angeles, California by Mike Osborn and Ron Penna. Originally, the company developed technology that monitored electronic transmissions for uses of counter-terrorism.

In 2010, a group headed by Brad Miller (former CEO of Perimeter eSecurity) and First New England Capital invested $6.5 million. In 2012, the company headquarters was relocated from Marina del Rey, California to Westport, Connecticut.

In 2016, the company acquired a mobile parental control and screen time management firm Screen Time Labs, based in Bristol, United Kingdom.

On June 12, 2019, Awareness Technologies acquired Veriato, formerly SpectorSoft, a technology company which established the insider risk industry in the late 1990s.

On December 20, 2020, TZP Group acquired Awareness Technologies. In conjunction with the acquisition, ATI announced the appointment of Elizabeth Harz as the company's new CEO.

== Brands ==
- Veriato – employee monitoring and insider risk detection for enterprise organizations.
- InterGuard – cloud-hosted employee productivity management solutions.
- ScreenTime – screen time management tools for parents
- WebWatcher – parental monitoring tools.

== Awards and distinctions ==
WebWatcher received the PC Magazine editors' choice award in a 2011 review of Parental Control & Monitoring software. Also, About.com readers named WebWatcher as the "Best Internet Safety Tool" as part of its 2011 Readers' Choice Awards.

ScreenTime Parental Control received the 2019 National Parenting Product Award.

Veriato won seven 2019 Cybersecurity Excellence Awards, including Best Cybersecurity Company and Best Insider Threat Solution for its Cerebral Insider Threat Intelligence Platform.

In 2022, Veriato Cerebral received the PCMag Editor’s Choice Award as the best employee monitoring software for complex threat detection.

== Users ==
Awareness Technologies products under the InterGuard software suite are used by technology companies, financial services, health care organizations and other industries. InterGuard gives administrators the ability to monitor activities of remote employees who work off of the corporate domain.
