= Computer surveillance in the workplace =

Use of computers to monitor activity and collect performance data in a workplace

Computer surveillance in the workplace is the use of computers to monitor activity in a workplace. Computer monitoring is a method of collecting performance data which employers obtain through digitalised employee monitoring. Computer surveillance may nowadays be used alongside traditional security applications, such as closed-circuit television.

== Computer usage monitoring ==
Depending upon the technology and methods used, monitoring applications may track all activity or may target specific activities of employees on a company-owned computer or terminal. They may monitor various devices installed on the computer (e.g., web cameras and microphones). This includes not only recordings from these devices but also remote broadcasting of live feed from webcams and microphones.

Tools used for monitoring employee computer usage incorporate:

- Screen monitoring records video or static images detailing the contents, or screen capture, of the entire video display or the content of the screen activity within a particular program or computer application. Monitoring tools may collect real time video, accelerated or time-lapse video or screen shots, or may take video or still image captures at regular intervals (e.g., once every 4 minutes). They may collect images constantly or only collect information while the user is interacting with the equipment (e.g., capturing screens when the mouse or keyboard is active).
- Data monitoring tracks the content of and changes to files stored on the local hard drive or in the user's "private" network share.
- Keystroke monitoring (e.g., number of keystrokes per minute) may track the performance of keyboard-intensive work such as word processing or data entry. Keystroke logging captures all keyboard input to enable the employer to monitor anything typed into the monitored machine.
- Idle time monitoring keeps track of time when the employee is away from the computer or the computer is not being actively used.
- Printer monitoring records documents files that are printed from the computer.
- Removable drives monitoring tracks external devices that are connected to the computer.
- Video/audio monitoring makes recordings and snapshots from connected devices webcam and microphone and broadcasts video/sound live.

This is also known as employee monitoring in the industry. Employee monitoring is used for multiple reasons, including compliance and Insider threat management. Employee monitoring software can monitor application software, including email, instant message, filesystem and print jobs.

== Internet usage ==
Internet surveillance is the monitoring of Internet data traffic, web access, and other online activity. This may include monitoring any Internet traffic including encrypted web browser traffic via Transport Layer Security and Secure Sockets Layer connections, personal web-based email, and personal banking sites. Research done by American Management Association that nearly 30 percent of all employers in the United States monitor employee e-mails.

== Legislation ==
Labor union contracts and other forms of employment agreements may offer some protection from monitoring. Additionally, in the United States, public sector employees may have some protection under the Fourth Amendment to the United States Constitution. Employees in California may have additional protection under specific portions of state statute.

Employers may be required to maintain documentation of emails and other communications for regulatory or compliance purposes. The monitoring of email and instant messaging communications may be part of these requirements.

Some software used for this type of surveillance may impose additional restrictions or notification requirements based on their End User License Agreement (EULA). For example, Spectorsoft requires that employees have signed a contract stating that their computer activity may be monitored when they were employed. Additional legal issues may arise if information obtained from the monitoring is used for illegal or malicious purposes.

== Employee perception ==
In organizations without stated computer usage or monitoring policy, employees typically use the company's equipment at their respective discretion and, in most cases, there may be no visible restrictions or monitoring of the activities performed on this computer. The use of computer surveillance within the employee discipline or evaluation process may be viewed by employees as an invasion of privacy or a lack of trust. Employers have the right to monitor their employees in the United States but of course, there are specific rules and regulations they must follow depending on the state legislation.

Despite the fact that almost 80% of all major companies in America actively monitor their employees, public opinion is still mostly on the employees’ side. Most of Americans still think that monitoring in the workplace is not entirely acceptable. According to Pew Research Center, only 6% of respondents do not care about being monitored at work.

Employee's relationship with employers may be affected with being monitored at work. The freedom, privacy, respect, and responsibility aspect between human relations may be taken away from an employee when being monitored.

== See also ==
- Surveillance
- Spyware
- Workplace privacy
