= Digital presenteeism =

Pressure for employees to be digitally available

Digital presenteeism is the expectation or pressure for employees to be available and responsive on digital communication platforms, such as email, instant messaging, or collaboration tools, even during non-working hours or when they are not physically present in the workplace. This phenomenon is often driven by the desire to demonstrate commitment, productivity, and responsiveness, and it can lead to overwork, burnout, and a poor work-life balance. It has also been attributed to job insecurity and fear of being made redundant.

Digital presenteeism has become more common following COVID-19. Workers may engage in productivity theater to appear busy. Reduced management visibility has been identified as a structural driver of the behavior, with employees linking constant digital availability to concerns about career advancement. A 2026 survey of 4,000 remote workers across the United Kingdom, Germany, Italy, and Spain found that 47.8% worked through illness more frequently than they had in office settings, with 33.8% attributing reduced manager visibility to lost career opportunities. Furthermore, 7.8% reported fully disconnecting from work when unwell.

== History ==
Presenteeism occurs outside of digitally-connected work. In a more general sense, presenteeism is the act or culture of employees continuing to work as a performative measure, despite having reduced productivity levels or negative consequences.
