= Workplace environment =

Workplace environment may refer to:

- Workplace — the physical location where work takes place, also known as an office
- Organizational culture — the social behaviors and norms in the workplace
