= Menopause in the workplace =

Menopause in the workplace is a social and human resources campaigning issue in which people work to raise awareness of the impact menopause symptoms can have on attendance and performance in the workplace.

== Activism ==
Campaigners, journalists, personnel professionals and academics draw upon published research and lobby for support for workers via industrial trades unions (including ACAS, TUC, UCU, UNISON, EIS, NASUTW) and changes in legislation. In the UK under the Equality Act 2010, menopause discrimination is covered by three of the protected characteristics: age, sex and disability discrimination. A UK government cross-party equalities working group explored why workplaces were failing women going through the menopause

== Background ==
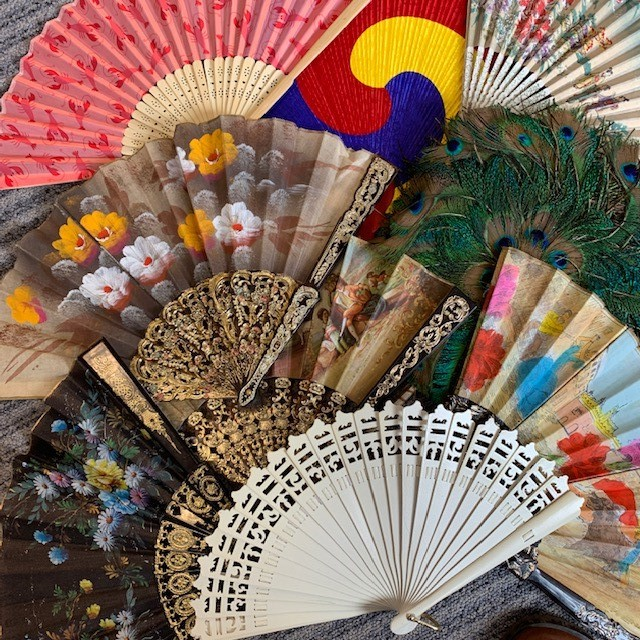
Hand fans, which are useful for combating menopausal hot flushes

The average age for the menopause transition is 51. Women over the age of 50 are a growing demographic in the workforce. 14 million working days are lost to menopause each year in the UK. Around 900,000 women have left jobs in the UK because of menopause symptoms making continuing work impossible.

A June 2023 study by the Mayo Clinic estimated an annual loss of $1.8 billion in the United States due to workdays missed as a result of menopause symptoms. This was one of the largest studies to date examining the impact of menopause symptoms on work outcomes. The research concluded there was a strong need to improve medical treatment for menopausal women and make the workplace environment more supportive to avoid such productivity losses.

Many women go through the menopause during their working lives, and workplace support is vital. Menopause is considered by many to be a private matter or ‘a women's issue' or the 'last taboo' subject in workplaces. The TUC found that many employers were unaware of the issues involved and not tackling problems in ways that helped workers. The impact of employers failing to make reasonable adjustments include loss of work days due to absence and women being disciplined on competency grounds for health issues. The number of UK employment tribunals concerning menopause is increasing.

A UK government report suggests that employers can make positive changes by "changing organisational cultures; compulsory equality and diversity training; providing specialist advice; tailored absence policies; flexible working patterns for mid-life women; and fairly low cost environmental changes" to cater for women's differing experiences. The CIPD have produced a range of guides for HR professionals and managers

There remains a research gap in evaluating the effectiveness of these interventions.

In the US, National Institute on Aging has conducted research exploring the impact of menopause on women's health and aging. Particular care has been taken to include in the research participants women from different racial and ethnic backgrounds, including African American, Chinese, Hispanic and Japanese. This has helped scientists identify racial and ethnic differences in women's experiences.

== Workplace culture ==
The social acceptability of discussions of menopause vary across cultures. Menopause is an intersectional issue of sex and age.

For many women it is experienced as a 'double or triple whammy' of home and workplace responsibilities coming as it does just at the time when their children are teenagers, their parents are elderly and they have just made it back from a career break. It may also come at the time of increased leadership and management responsibilities. When women eligible for senior management roles leave work at the peak of their careers, there are compounding effects on the gender pay-gap and the gender pension gap. Three out of five (59%) working women between the ages of 45 and 55 who are experiencing menopause symptoms say it has a negative impact on them at work

Menopause support may also be linked to mental health at work. A 2018 Radio 4 Woman's Hour poll that found that 48% of women experiencing the menopause reported that it had "a negative impact on their mental health and mood". Employers may not be aware that there are different cultural attitudes to menopause. In the workplace menopause becomes an intersectional issue of supporting workers with regard to age, sex, disability and race.

As of yet, menopause is not a protected characteristic specified under the Equality Act 2010. The Health and Safety at Work etc. Act 1974 provides for safe working, which extends to the working conditions when experiencing symptoms of menopause. Recently, there have been calls made for further legislation to require employers to put in place a workplace menopause policy to protect women going through the menopause against discrimination whilst at work.

== Remote working ==
Some aspects of workplace environments can make menopause symptoms worse, especially hot or poorly ventilated environments.

Menopause also impacts remote workers. During the COVID-19 pandemic, many women who had previously worked on their employer's premises shifted to remote work. While there are some elements of remote work which might be assumed to be better for menopausal women such as more control over the temperature and comfort of their home environments, there are multiple factors, such as the responsibilities of home schooling and sharing limited space in the home, which combined to shape working women's experiences of lockdown.

== Changes to the law ==
Caroline Nokes, Chair of the Women and Equalities Committee, said in 2021: "Three in every five women are negatively affected at work as a result of the menopause. The repercussions of that are not merely individual. Excluding menopausal women from the workplace is detrimental to our economy, our society and our place on the world stage. Despite the fact that hundreds of thousands of women in the UK are currently going through the menopause- a process that can be both physically and mentally draining- it is ignored in legislation. It is time to uncover and address this huge issue, which has been left near-invisible for far too long."

In 2022 members of the UK government considered amending the Equality Act 2010 to include menopause as a protected characteristic. They also hoped to require employers to provide reasonable adjustments for employees experiencing menopause. As it stands, UK law fails to provide proper redress for women who are discriminated against in the workplace as a result of their menopausal status. There is also generally poor understanding of health and safety at work in this regard. The authors of the report propose significant change to improve the working conditions for women and those who ultimately seek legal redress:

Our recommendations for employers are designed to ensure fewer women need legal redress. However, those who do need to rely on the law need, and deserve, a better safety net. We call on the Government to commence section 14 of the Equality Act 2010 to allow dual discrimination claims based on more than one protected characteristic. We also want the Government to urgently consult on making menopause a protected characteristic under the Equality Act 2010.

== Menopause leave ==
The 2022 report from the UK Women and Equalities Committee stimulated discussions about the possibility of employers establishing policies and support for 'menopause leave'.

== Types of work ==
=== Media and entertainment industry ===
There are a number of high-profile media professionals and journalists in the UK who have worked to raise awareness of menopause through sharing their own experiences publicly. These include Patsy Kensit, Davina McCall, Jenni Murray, Kirsty Wark, Jennifer Saunders, Bridget Christie, Jo Whiley and Jenny Eclair.

=== Universities ===
Some higher education institutions have made changes to support their staff. These include University of Leicester and University College London.

Academics who research in this area include: Jo Brewis, Belinda Steffan, Wendy Loretto and Myra Hunter.

=== Teaching ===
Guidance for supporting teachers during menopause has been published by EIS, NASUWT and NEU

=== Police forces ===
The Police in England and Wales have published National Menopause Guidance which is designed to help support and advise individuals, line managers, senior leaders and occupational health advisors The national lead for Gender at the National Police Chiefs' Council, said: "I genuinely believe that the launch of this guidance is a huge step forward for policing." The demographic of the police workforce across the UK is changing, with an increasing number of female colleagues, and an aging workforce in key front-line roles as well as other roles in our organisations. There are clear health and safety implications for women, their colleagues, and the general public, if we do not support, understand and deal with menopause issues properly. Support is also available for members of Police Federation Scotland and Police Federation of Northern Ireland.

=== NHS ===
The NHS recognise that "with our population now living longer, working longer, and with so many women working in the NHS, it's vital that staff are supported to stay well and thrive in the workplace". The BMA argue that employers should take a pro-active approach to an inclusive workplace.

=== Politics ===
British MPs have pushed for clear workplace policies to protect women going through the menopause. Rachel Maclean said "My central message is: menopause is the last taboo because it is still hidden and it only affects women and it only affects older women. It's ageism, it's sexism, all rolled into one." Other women who have spoken about their experiences include Carolyn Harris, Julie Marson, Maria Caulfield, and Caroline Nokes. Dawn Butler, in her role as Shadow Women and Equalities Secretary, announced the Labour Party's commitment to introduce a menopause workplace policy including providing and ensuring flexible working policies and absence procedures that cater for women experiencing the menopause. This menopause workplace policy was included in the Labour Party's 2019 Manifesto.

=== Legal ===
The Law Society issued guidance for women experiencing menopause in the legal profession and guidance for judges receiving evidence from women.
