= Political positions of Isko Moreno =

Political positions of Mayor Isko Moreno

Moreno during his campaign rally in Kawit, Cavite on March 18, 2022

Isko Moreno, the 27th and 29th mayor of Manila, the Philippines' capital city, from 2019 to 2022 and again since 2025, and a candidate in the 2022 Philippine presidential election, took positions on several political issues through his public comments and his presidential campaign statements.

== Domestic and economic policies ==
=== Campaign against illegal drugs ===
Moreno supports the Duterte administration's flagship war on drugs but without extrajudicial killings linked to it.

=== Economy ===
Moreno supports the idea on giving financial assistance to micro, small, and medium enterprises (MSMEs), including 0% interest on loans in financial institutions. Moreno is an advocate of using advanced technology in the agriculture sector. Moreno envisions a Department of National Culture and History in the executive branch. He also supports countryside development by constructing a "tourism circuit" and is in favor of digital transformation. Moreno is also in favor of ending contractualization but wants the government to increase employment rate first by generating as many jobs as possible before considering such action.

=== Environment ===
Moreno advocates sustainable reforestation in denuded forests by involving indigenous peoples. Moreno is also in favor of responsible mining.

=== Fake news ===
Moreno is in favor of legally penalizing social media sites promoting fake news, disinformation, and misinformation, reiterating his stance as "non-negotiable".

=== Ferdinand Marcos ===
Moreno has said that he admired former President Ferdinand E. Marcos Sr. "at some point", specifically for being a "visionary" and for his infrastructure projects, but condemns his links to corruption and human rights abuses. He also believes that abusers during martial law should be made accountable, and stands firm that martial law must not happen again. Moreno also supports the annual commemoration of the People Power Revolution.

=== Freedom of Information ===
Moreno is in favor that all government officials should be open to disclosing their Statement of Assets, Liabilities, and Net Worth (SALN), including "their properties, belongings and their debts", being a public document. He also believes that the policy on Freedom of Information should be strengthened.

=== Infrastructure ===
Moreno has expressed support for the "Build! Build! Build!" infrastructure program of the Duterte administration. He envisions a well-planned zoning by making the National Land Use Act a priority legislation. Moreno is in favor of implementing socialized housing programs nationwide. He has, however, shown opposition towards the administration's nationwide bike lane network specifically for the City of Manila, believing that the roads of Manila are "too dangerous" for cycling.

=== Maritime ===
Moreno spoke strongly on re-evaluating the current setup of the shipbuilding industry in the Philippines, criticizing it by saying that the brand new ships that are built overseas "enjoy tax incentives" but not the ships built by local shipbuilders which generate employment for the country.

=== Party system ===
Moreno pitched the need for the country to shift back to a two-party system for "smooth-sailing governance". Moreno also prefers the election of two senators per region for equal representation and expressed support for the continuation of the party-list representation system but emphasized that there should be safeguards to avoid abuse and manipulation, preferably regionalized to distance away from the idea of Imperial Manila. He also criticized that the party-list system is being used to exploit the poor and extend political dynasties.

=== Political dynasties ===
Moreno bans family members to enter politics or any public office while he remains in a government office. He expressed that he is "not comfortable" with the existence of political dynasties and is in favor of an anti-political dynasty law.

=== Political turncoatism ===
Moreno is not against transferring from one political party to another whenever he sees fit. He has expressed that he does not mind being called a "political butterfly", stating he would rather leave a political party whenever the party loses public trust and if his political principles does not coincide with the party's anymore. He added that "a public servant's loyalty should not lie with a political party, but rather to the people".

=== Vandalism ===
Moreno is also known for his consistent and controversial stand against vandalism and unauthorized tarpaulins.

On November 12, 2019, the left-leaning group Panday Sining, the cultural arm of Anakbayan, defaced the newly-painted and cleaned Lagusnilad Underpass located near the Manila City Hall. Moreno slammed the group publicly and rejected their apology. The mayor also proceeded with their arrest after another act of vandalism in Recto LRT Station was attributed to the group. Panday Sining was officially declared as "persona non grata" in the city of Manila on December 6, 2019. Many left-leaning groups condemned the mayor's actions against them.

In October 2020, Moreno ordered the removal of the tarpaulins declaring the Communist Party of the Philippines, as well as the New People's Army and the National Democratic Front, as persona non grata in the National Capital Region. However this event prompted Lt. Gen. Antonio Parlade Jr., spokesperson of the National Task Force to End Local Communist Armed Conflict to ask if Mayor Isko is welcoming terrorists into Manila. Moreno responded that they have an ordinance against all forms of vandalism. A few days after, Moreno publicly slammed and ordered the removal of graffiti painted by leftist advocates around Welcome Rotonda. On December 7, 2020, in an interview posted on YouTube, Moreno vehemently denied any support for or affiliation with the terrorist groups. Moreno is also against tarpaulins featuring faces of politicians even if they happen to be his partymates and had ordered the removal of tarpaulins that are political in nature since he assumed office.

== Social policy ==
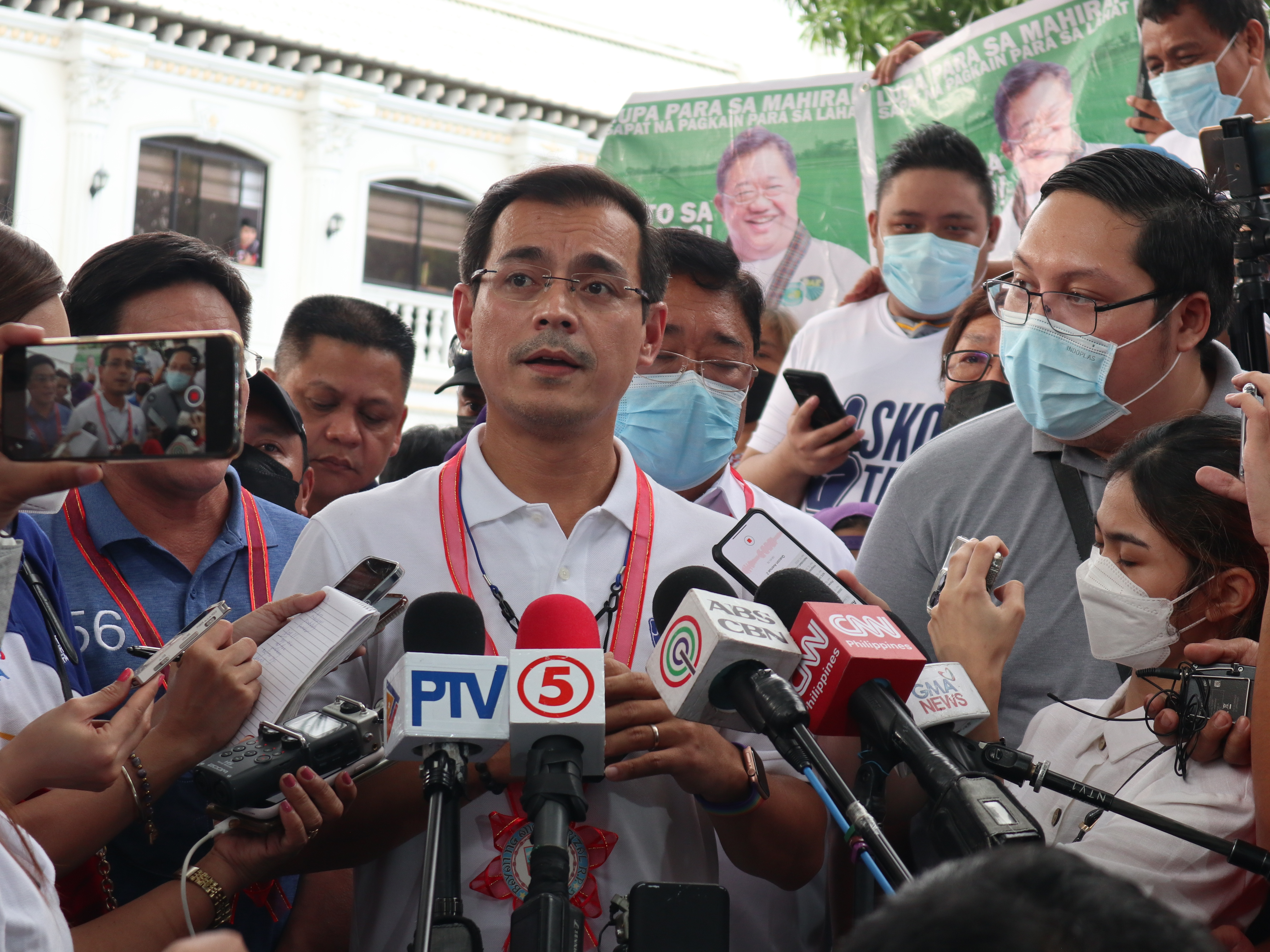
Moreno during an ambush interview with the media in 2022

=== Abortion and contraception ===
Moreno is categorically opposed to abortion, reiterating his belief in the "sanctity of life". However, he is open for the government to provide other interventions that would help rape victims "move forward with their lives without harming their child". He is also open to the existing legality of "therapeutic abortion" in the country for medical necessity. Nevertheless, Moreno is in favor for people to freely choose whatever contraception and family planning method they prefer that can be offered by the state.

=== Age of criminal liability ===
Moreno is against the lowering of the age of criminal liability from age 15 to age 9.

=== Capital punishment ===
Moreno is against the reinstatement of the death penalty describing it as "cruel" as it affects wrongly sentenced prisoners.

=== Divorce ===
Moreno is in favor of the legalization of divorce in the Philippines.

=== Education ===
Moreno is in favor of amending the educational curriculum in the country by developing tech-voc and agriculture courses in basic education, as well as enhancing the science, technology, engineering, and mathematics curriculum. Moreno is also in favor of enhancing early childhood education and development, as well as improving the accessibility to the internet of students and teachers.

=== Health ===
Moreno expressed the idea to invest in local human resources such as doctors and scientists to make locally made medicines, even a vaccine, in addressing the COVID-19 pandemic in the Philippines. Moreno supports boosting vaccinations and establishing additional specialty hospitals in each of all 17 administrative regions. He also advocates for the establishment of the Cancer Center of the Philippines aiming to provide free medicines and medical procedures to indigents. Moreno is against the legalization of medical marijuana stating that the "government should fix its system first" since it will be subject to abuse, but would reconsider if "further studies from science will prove that marijuana is a more effective treatment than other medicines." Moreno supports the vaping bill and the regulation of electronic cigarettes to provide smokers with alternatives to traditional cigarettes. Moreno is also in favor of promoting and strengthening policies in mental health. Additionally, Moreno believes that PhilHealth will be better managed by financial experts. He also supports increasing wages and benefits of healthcare workers.

=== LGBT+ rights ===
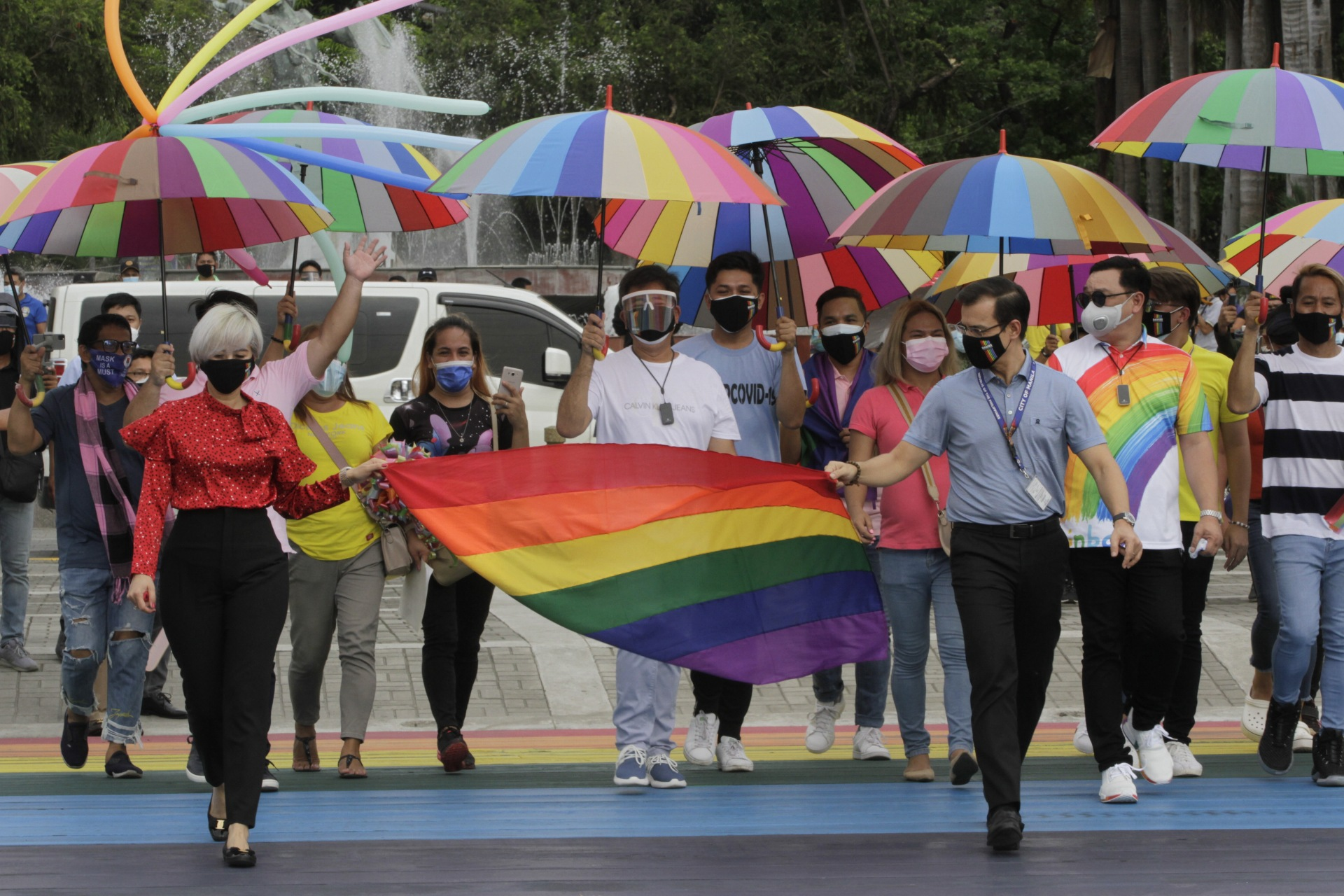
Moreno (right) and then-Vice Mayor Honey Lacuna (left) displaying the LGBTQI flag and walking on the rainbow-colored LGBTQI pedestrian lane in front of the Plaza Rajah Sulayman along Roxas Boulevard, which the city government of Manila inaugurated headed by Moreno, in support of the sector

In October 2020, Moreno signed Ordinance 8695 protecting members of the LGBT community from any and all forms of discrimination and abuse, including the denial of employment and other opportunities on the basis of the person's sexual orientation, gender identity, and expression. As part of its campaign against discrimination, the Manila city government has mandated all establishments to have gender-neutral toilets by year 2023 and would be a requirement for the approval and renewal of business permits.

However, he clarified in an interview that he is not in favor of same-sex marriage. He added that "it is our law and in a civilized world, we are guided by the law". Nonetheless, Moreno supports same-sex civil unions.

=== Pornography ===
Moreno is in favor of legally penalizing social media sites promoting pornography.

=== Women's rights ===
In November 2020, Moreno signed into law Ordinance 8681 known as the "Gender and Development Code of the City of Manila" or the "GAD Code" which prohibits and classifies cursing, ridiculing, catcalling, and wolf-whistling on women as forms of sexual harassment, along with acts like repeatedly asking for dates despite verbal rejections, making offensive hand gestures or persistently telling "green jokes" to someone who finds it offensive or humiliating. It also mandates the city government to provide comprehensive support to survivors of violence, which includes immediate conduct of investigations, free counseling and medical services, and creation of community-based psychological programs and support groups. Women Crisis Centers in key districts of Manila shall also be established. Additionally, the ordinance increased maternity leave benefits from 65 days under Republic Act 11210 to 105 days and paternity leave benefits for fathers' participation in the aid of their newborn child for 14 days from the seven days mandated by law under Republic Act 8187. It further provides for a yearly 12-day menstrual/menopausal leave for women employees in private offices and commercial/industrial establishments located in the city, who have rendered at least one year continuous service. The ordinance also mandates the barangay GAD committee to organize elderly women within the barangay to advance their practical and strategic interests and needs. Beauty contests which tend to commodify, abuse, humiliate and treat other persons especially women and homosexual as sex objects shall strictly be prohibited in schools, communities, barangays and the city government in its special celebrations. The city and the barangay council are also mandated to ensure that at least one-third of its members is composed of women.

Moreno has praised the country's female medical and health workers as well as the other women frontliners in various fields, acknowledging their roles as "critical and crucial as much as their male counterparts" in the country's response against COVID-19. He also lauded the mothers who need to leave their families in order to fulfill their duties as frontliners. Moreno also recognized the efforts of his then-vice mayor Honey Lacuna, the first ever elected female vice mayor in the history of Manila, calling her an "effective leader who has taken solid steps in gender equality and women empowerment" and described her as like an older sister to him. He gave Lacuna executive functions on a par with his mayoral duties. During Moreno's term as mayor, almost 50 percent of the City Hall's employees are women.

== Foreign policy ==
=== General ===
Moreno expressed strong opinions on a foreign policy aligned with what he calls a "Filipino-first" policy, envisioning that the Philippines will forge contracts, organizations, and even trade agreements, for that matter, if it is only beneficial to Filipinos.

=== International Criminal Court ===
Moreno expressed support of the Philippines returning to the International Criminal Court (ICC) if the move would "give a good impression to the world".

=== OFW ===
Moreno is in favor of entering bilateral labor agreement with other countries to ensure the welfare of both documented and undocumented Overseas Filipino Workers (OFW).

=== South China Sea dispute and China relations ===
Moreno agrees that the Philippines is not "militarily prepared" for an encounter with China, and that order must be upheld such as the Law of the Sea. He believes that the country's defense secretary should come from the navy, since the Philippines is an archipelagic country. On the issue of the country's claim to the West Philippine Sea occupied by Chinese forces, he believes that the Philippines' approach should be "fearless" in asserting the claim and should be responsive to the plight of Filipino fishermen, while at the same time should be "fair" and "sensible" in dealing with other countries also occupying the South China Sea, especially in trade. Moreno has criticized the United Nations (UN), questioning what they are doing in light of China's disregard of the Permanent Court of Arbitration (PCA). Moreno asserted that China needs to accept a 2016 arbitration award of the Hague ruling that made clear the Philippines' entitlements, including where it can fish and exploit offshore oil and gas, also citing the Velarde map as reference. However, he also expressed opinion in forming partnerships with other countries as well as to prepare in terms of joint trade with China.
