= Rosetta Code =

Wiki-based programming chrestomathy

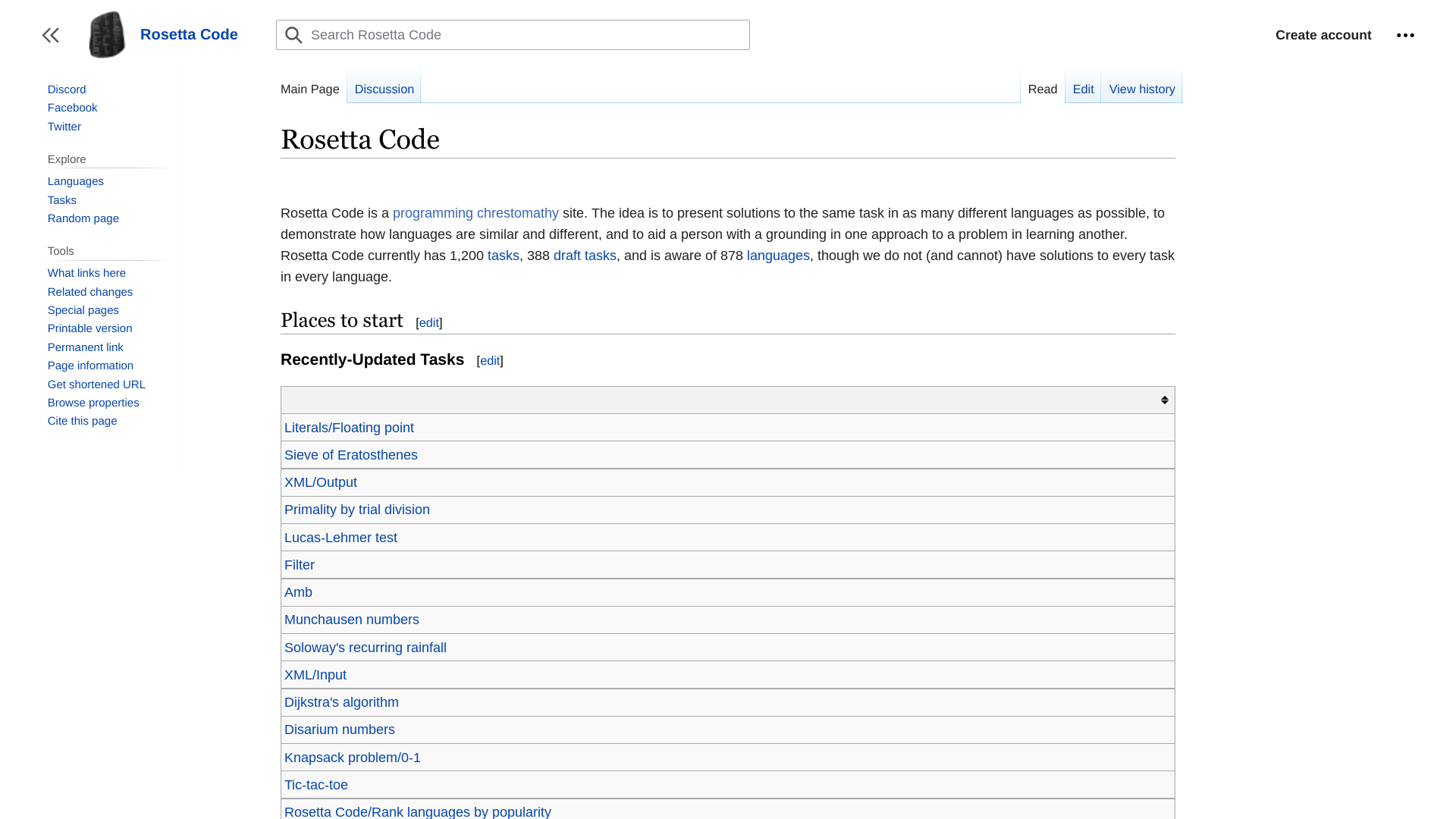
- Front page of rosettacode.org
- Available in: English
- Website: www.rosettacode.org
- Launched: January 1, 2007; 19 years ago
- Current status: Online
- Content license: GFDL
- Written in: PHP, MediaWiki

Rosetta Code is a wiki-based programming chrestomathy website with implementations of common algorithms and solutions to various programming problems in many different programming languages. It is named for the Rosetta Stone, which has the same text inscribed on it in three languages, and thus allowed Egyptian hieroglyphs to be deciphered for the first time.

== Website ==
Rosetta Code was created in 2007 by Michael Mol. The site's content is licensed under the GNU Free Documentation License 1.2, though some components may be dual-licensed under more permissive terms.

The Rosetta Code web repository illustrates how desired functionality is implemented very differently in various programming paradigms, and how "the same" task is accomplished in different programming languages.

As of 22 February 2024, Rosetta Code has:

- 1,266 computer programming tasks (or problems)
- 404 additional draft programming tasks
- 933 computer programming languages that are used to solve tasks

In August 2022, Rosetta Code migrated from independent hosting to Miraheze.

=== Data and structure ===
The Rosetta Code site is organized as a browsable cross-section of tasks (specific programming problems or considerations) and computer programming languages. A task's page displays visitor-contributed solutions in various computer languages, allowing a viewer to compare each language's approach to the task's stated problem.

Task pages are included in per-language listings based on the languages of provided solutions; a task with a solution in the C programming language will appear in the listing for C. If the same task has a solution in Ruby, the task will appear in the listing for Ruby as well.

=== Languages ===
Some of the computer programming languages found on Rosetta Code (which have Wikipedia descriptions) include:

- Ada
- ALGOL 60
- ALGOL 68
- ALGOL W
- APL
- AWK
- AutoHotKey
- BASIC (58 variants)
- C
- C#
- C++
- Ceylon
- Clojure
- COBOL
- Common Lisp
- D
- Delphi
- Erlang
- F#
- Factor
- Forth
- Fortran
- Elixir
- Go
- Apache Groovy
- Haskell
- Icon
- J
- Java
- JavaScript
- Julia
- Kotlin
- Lua
- Maple
- Mathematica
- MATLAB
- Nim
- OCaml
- Octave
- ooRexx
- PARI/GP
- Pascal
- Perl
- PHP
- Picolisp
- PL/I
- PowerShell
- Prolog
- PureBasic
- Python
- R
- Racket
- Raku (Perl 6)
- Red
- REXX
- Ruby
- Rust
- Scala
- Scheme
- Seed7
- SequenceL
- Swift
- Tcl
- Unicon
- V (Vlang)
- XPL0

A complete list of the computer programming languages that have examples (entries/solutions to the Rosetta Code tasks) is available.

== Tasks ==
Some of the tasks found on Rosetta Code include:

- "99 Bottles of Beer" (song)
- Abbreviations
- Ackermann function
- Amicable numbers
- Anagrams
- Bernoulli numbers
- Bitwise operations
- Cholesky decomposition
- Combinations
- Comments
- Continued fractions
- Cyclic redundancy check (CRC-32)
- de Bruijn sequence
- Death Star (draw)
- Dot product
- Dragon curve
- Egyptian fractions
- Eight queens puzzle
- Factorials
- Fibonacci sequence
- FizzBuzz
- Galton box (bean box) animation
- Gamma function
- Gaussian elimination
- Greatest common divisor (GCD)
- Hello world program Hello world/Text
- Hofstadter Q sequence
- Infinity
- Least common multiple (LCM)
- Leonardo numbers
- Levenshtein distance
- Look-and-say sequence
- Lucas numbers
- Lucas–Lehmer primality test
- Mandelbrot set (draw)
- Mersenne primes
- Miller–Rabin primality test
- Morse code
- Numerical integration
- Pascal's triangle (draw)
- Perfect numbers
- Permutations
- Prime numbers (102 tasks)
- Primorial numbers
- Quaternions
- Quine
- Random numbers
- Rock-paper-scissors (play)
- Roman numerals (encode/decode)
- Roots of unity
- roots of a function
- Rot13—a simple letter substitution cipher
- Runge–Kutta method
- SEDOLs
- Semiprimes
- Sierpinski triangle (draw)
- Sorting algorithms (41)
- Square-free integers
- Statistics
- Stem-and-leaf display
- Function definition
- Sudoku (solve)
- Taxicab numbers
- Thue–Morse sequence
- Tic-tac-toe (noughts and crosses)
- Tower of Hanoi (solve)
- Trigonometric functions
- Ulam spiral (draw)
- Vampire numbers
- Xiaolin Wu's line algorithm (draw)
- Zebra Puzzle or Einstein riddle
- Zeckendorf representation

== See also ==
- Example-centric programming
- Wikifunctions – Wikimedia open library of reusable code
