= Process tracing in psychology =

Process tracing methods in psychology are defined as observations which are made before the participant has come to a decision. These observations are used to present us with information regarding the psychological processes occurring within a participant, while they are weighing their choices. More specifically, process tracing methods examine participant's information acquisition process, how much information or content they've acquired, for how long this process occurred etc. Process tracing methods can also test the subtleties of decision making, since how the information is presented can change decisions, which can shed more light in what influences decisions and how people process information. Most of these methods are considered to be particularly unobtrusive, since the processes that they study are generally natural (i.e. eye gazing), and do not interfere with the decision process. Process-tracing in psychology can consist of various methods, namely observational, experimental, physiological, or neuroscientific.

There are two criteria that process tracing methods which study psychological processes should fit. Primarily, there has to be some measurable cognitive changes during the process, and secondarily, the data being collected must test the hypothesis made.

== Methods ==
What differentiates process tracing methods from other methods that study decision making, is that they usually aim to study the processes which are occurring before or during the time a decision is made. For example, the measurement of reaction time cannot be considered a process-tracing method, since although they study the amount of time it takes for a participant to make a decision, they do not shed light on the cognitive processes underlying it.

There are many different ways underlying cognitive decision making can be studied, but there are three main methods in which process-tracing techniques are divided. Movement-based measures provide data on information research patterns. Subject reports measures observe decision strategies usually through having the participants verbalize their thought processes. Peripheral psychophysiological measures quantify arousal and cognitive effort.

=== Method 1 - Movement-based methods ===
Movement-based methods are used for tracing information acquisition. Some specific ones are eye tracking (Eyegaze), mouse tracing (Mouselab), or other active information search methods. These methods avoid participant self report and various other process interruptions. Furthermore, they are less expensive, and have a wider outreach than other methods, which makes them highly attractive to study various cognitive processes.

The methods, however, can have differences between each other. For example, it has been reported that computerized tools such as mouse tracing take longer to assess information than do methods such as eye gaze. There is further research to be done regarding the complete consequences of the difference between these methods.

=== Method 2 - Subject reports ===
Methods for tracing information integration are used after the participant has presumably formed a perception of the information presented to her. These methods aim to study how the information is integrated after it has been introduced, and how that integration leads to a choice. A popular model to study information integration is verbalized thoughts. Unlike movement-based methods, verbal methods are more direct, they aim to measure the internal process and not the behavior of the participant.

=== Method 3 - Peripheral psychophysiological processes ===
Psychophysiological processes focus primarily on studying how different brain regions are activated during decision making. The techniques of this method include electrodermal activity, pupil dilation, or fMRI. Such methods are now being used to shed light in organizational neuroscience, specifically decision making

== Advantages ==
Before process-tracing, the study of cognitive processes relied on participants reporting experienced difficulties during or after the experiment, which would potentially result in the participant justifying their process, participant anticipating the questions and therefore providing a biased description, and participant having difficulties recalling process and therefore misreporting it. As mentioned above, current process-tracing methods allow us to infer cognitive processes without interrupting natural cognitive procedures. Methods such as measuring heart rate have shed light in choices related to risk aversion. Methods such as fMRI and EEG shed light on the neural circuits involved in decision making and how they interact with each other. Methods such as TMS allow research to observe behavioral change by intervening in neural circuits. Additionally, computational neuroscience is developing in a way that allows us to replicate these mechanisms and further analyze them through data.

== Limitations ==
There are a few limitations that come with process-tracing methods, primarily because some methods are more intrusive than others, and with intrusive methods one should be cautious with the results they produce. Distortion risks could be presented when using methods such as cameras or microphones for observation, or when presenting information to participants in different ways. We can also not discount the potential risks of these experiments happening in unnatural environments, especially when involving such methods as fMRI scans

As mentioned above, different process tracing methods require different levels of effort in order to analyze data. It is still a question whether the usage of different process tracing methods changes the decision-making process, and therefore provides us with different results. It is also a question how each process tracing method could potentially change the results, and how can we control for this interruption in validity?. For example, Russo (1977) changed supermarket shopper's choices by pushing them towards purchasing products with lower unit prices.
