= Bărbulescu v. Romania =

Law case

- Court: European Court of Human Rights
- Citation: 61496/08

Bărbulescu v. Romania is a European labour law case, concerning employee monitoring and holding that workers have a right to a reasonable expectation of privacy.

== Facts ==
The employee Mr. Bărbulescu accused the employer of violating his rights to ‘private life’ and ‘correspondence’ set in the Article 8 of the European Convention on Human Rights.

== Judgment ==
The court held that a sales engineer had a 'reasonable expectation of privacy' against personal messages being read (including those to his fiancé and his brother), even though he was told not to use a workplace Yahoo messenger for personal reasons, because "an employer’s instructions cannot reduce private social life in the workplace to zero. Respect for private life and for the privacy of correspondence continues to exist, even if these may be restricted in so far as necessary".

== See also ==
- European labour law
- UK labour law
