= Session replay =

Ability to replay a journey on a website or application

Session replay is the ability to replay a visitor's journey on a web site or within a mobile application or web application. Replay can include the user's view (browser or screen output), user input (keyboard and mouse inputs), and logs of network events or console logs. Session replay is supposed to help improve customer experience and help identify obstacles in conversion processes on websites. However, it can also be used to study a website's usability, customer behavior, and the handling of customer service questions as the customer journey, with all interactions, can be replayed. Some organizations also use this capability to analyse fraudulent behavior on websites.

Some solutions augment the session replay with advanced analytics that can identify segments of customers that are struggling to use the website. This allows for the replay capability to be used much more efficiently and reduces the need to replay other customer sessions unnecessarily.

There are generally two ways to capture and replay visitor sessions, client side and tag-free server side.

== Client side ==
There are many tag-based solutions that offer video-like replay of a visitor's session. While replay is analogous to video, it is more accurately a reproduction of a specific user's experience detailing mouse movements, clicks, taps, and scrolls. The underlying data for the session recordings is captured by tagging pages. Some advanced tools are able to access the Document Object Model (DOM) directly and can play back most interactions within the DOM including all mutations with a high degree of accuracy. There are a number of tools that provide similar functions, with the advantage of being able to replay the entire client experience in a movie-like format. It also can deal with modern single-page applications. The disadvantage is that the tracking script can easily be detected and blocked by any ad blocker which has become normal (2017: 615M devices with active adblock).

== Tag-free server side ==
These solutions capture all website traffic and replay every visitor interaction from every device, and these include all mobile users from any location. Sessions are replayed step-by-step, providing the ability to search, locate and analyze aspects of a visitor's session including clicks and form entry. Server-side solutions require hardware and software to be installed "on premises." An advantage of server-side recording is that the solution cannot be blocked. However, one will not be able to see a video-like replay of client-side activities such as scrolling and mouse movements. This also poorly handles modern single-page applications.

== Hybrid: Tag-free server side combined with client-side tracking ==
A hybrid approach combines the advantages without the weaknesses. The hybrid approach ensures that every session is recorded (important for compliance) by server-side capturing and enriched with client-side tracking data of mouse movements, clicks, scrolling, keystrokes, and user behavior (driven by customer experience insights). This approach works very well with modern single-page applications. There is the presence of a movie-like replay and 100% compliant capturing. This can be deployed either "on premises" or as Software as a service (SaaS).

All of the tools listed below are available as Software as a service (SaaS) solutions.

== See also ==
- Macro recorder
- Replay attack
- Sniffing attack
- Data privacy
