= Veriato =

Veriato, Inc.
- Type: Private Company
- Industry: Software
- Founded: 1998−2016 as SpectorSoft; 2016 renamed Veriato
- Headquarters: West Palm Beach, Florida; United States
- Key people: Elizabeth Harz (CEO)
- Products: Insider Risk Management & User Monitoring Software
- Website: veriato.com

Veriato, formerly known as SpectorSoft, is a software company that develops and sells user behavior analytics and employee monitoring software.

The company is based in West Palm Beach, Florida, United States and was acquired in 2019 by Awareness Technologies.

== History ==
Founded in 1998, the company was an early entrant in internet monitoring software.

In 2008, private equity firms Harbourvest Partners and WestView Capital Partners invested in the company, taking a majority ownership position. SpectorSoft originally serviced both consumer and business customers, but no longer sells software for consumer or home use.

In 2011, the company opened their West Palm Beach office and London office.

In 2012 SpectorSoft acquired the assets of Corner Bowl Software.

On March 31, 2015, the company completely exited the consumer market.

In 2016 the company was renamed Veriato, Inc.

On June 12, 2019, Veriato was acquired by Awareness Technologies, which was later acquired by TZP Group in December 2020.

== Patent Infringement case ==
Patent Infringement Case Helios Software LLC et al. v. SpectorSoft Corporation has concluded. In September 2014, the Court granted summary judgment of non-infringement as to the ‘571 and ‘237 Patents. In June 2015, after a five-day trial, a jury returned a verdict of no direct or indirect infringement by SpectorSoft of the ‘304 Patent, and also found several of the asserted claims of that patent invalid as both anticipated and rendered obvious by prior art (see Docket Entry No. 615 for Civ. No. 12-081-LPS).

== See also ==
- Computer monitoring
- Employee monitoring software
