= Jenni Murray =

British journalist and broadcaster (1950–2026)

Dame Jenni Murray DBE
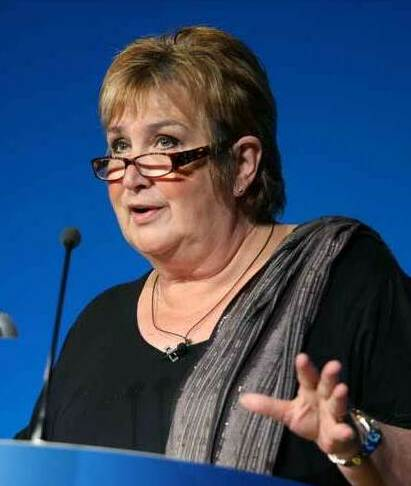
- Murray in 2011
- Born: Jennifer Susan Bailey; 12 May 1950; Barnsley, West Riding of Yorkshire, England
- Died: 12 March 2026 (aged 75); London, England
- Occupations: Journalist; broadcaster
- Spouses: Brian Murray (m. 1971–1977); David Forgham (m. 2002)
- Children: 2

Dame Jenni Murray (née Bailey; 12 May 1950 – 12 March 2026) was a British journalist and broadcaster, best known for presenting BBC Radio 4's Woman's Hour from 1987 to 2020.

== Early life ==
Murray was born in Barnsley, in the West Riding of Yorkshire (now South Yorkshire) on 12 May 1950, the only child of Alvin Bailey, an electrical engineer, and Winifred Jones, a civil servant. At age 5, her mother sent Murray for elocution lessons, to iron out her regional accent. When she was 11, her father's career took him to India and she refused to accompany her parents, opting instead to live with her maternal grandparents, enabling her to attend Barnsley Girls' High School, a grammar school, which she left with A levels in French, English and History. She earned a degree in French and Drama from the University of Hull.

== Career ==
Murray worked as a copy taker, then producer and presenter, at BBC Radio Bristol between 1973 and 1978. She was employed as a reporter and presenter with BBC regional TV news programme South Today from 1978 to 1984. She was a newsreader and later one of the presenters of the BBC's Newsnight television show for two years from 1984 to 1986, before moving to BBC Radio 4 to co-present the Today programme until 1987. She succeeded Sue MacGregor as presenter of Woman's Hour in 1987. She also presented BBC Radio 4's The Message and wrote for magazines and newspapers including The Guardian, the Daily Express and the Daily Mail. She also wrote several books on topics including women's rights, parenting and menopause. She hosted her final Woman's Hour on 1 October 2020.

In March 2017, Murray published an article in The Sunday Times headlined "Be trans, be proud – but don't call yourself a 'real woman'." The resulting controversy led her to cancel a scheduled Oxford University History Society presentation in November 2018. In a 2020 article for the Daily Mail, Murray said that the BBC had banned her from chairing "any discussions on the trans question or the proposed changes to the Gender Recognition Act" following her departure from Woman's Hour. In November 2023, Murray signed an open letter from Sex Matters urging the Prime Minister, Rishi Sunak, "to take urgent action to halt an escalating campaign of violence and intimidation against women in the name of 'trans rights'".

== Personal life ==
Murray was brought up a Christian in the Church of England. At the age of 14, however, just before they visited Auschwitz concentration camp, her father revealed he was Jewish by birth from his mother Edith Field (originally Feld). Murray subsequently wrote on 21 December 2022 in The Daily Mail and on Twitter: "Officially I have no claim to the Jewish faith, but I feel it deeply, and have done since the age of 14 when my father revealed to me what, until then, he had kept a closely guarded secret. I am not religious, but I feel my Jewish genes. They are part of my race. They took me to Israel in my early 20s, against the advice of my parents who were afraid for me, but I wanted to know more." She spent a year working at the Frank Meisler sculpture gallery in Jaffa. She also wrote of her abhorrence of racism: "young people need to understand the history of slavery and how it influences modern racism, they need to understand what lay behind the Holocaust and how it continues to affect the Jewish population."

She married her first husband, Brian Murray, aged 21; their marriage ended after six years. She later began a relationship with David Forgham, with whom she had two sons and they subsequently married in 2002, on advice from their financial adviser, who had raised inheritance tax concerns.

=== Health ===
In December 2006, Murray announced, at the end of Woman's Hour, that she had been diagnosed with breast cancer. She informed her audience that her prognosis was good and she did indeed return early in 2007. She reported that the most emotionally upsetting moment was losing her hair and used this as an item on the centrality of hair to definitions of femininity. In 2020, Murray announced that she would demonstrate proper self-breast examination techniques on The Real Full Monty on Ice television programme, alongside Linda Lusardi and Hayley Tamaddon.

Murray was vocal and visible in the media with regard to her own experience of menopause, HRT and the importance of raising awareness of this aspect of women's health in the workplace and more generally.

In 2008, Murray had a hip replacement following avascular necrosis. She had a sleeve gastrectomy in June 2015 and had lost more than 4 stone (56 lb; 25 kg) by October that year.

=== Death ===
On 4 March 2026, Murray was involved in a car collision near Hampstead Heath, in which her car crashed into two stationary vehicles after she had been dazzled by a vehicle's lights. She was unable to recall events following the crash, however exited her car independently and was conveyed to the Royal Free Hospital. Murray died eight days later on 12 March 2026, aged 75. Her death was announced a week later, with a tribute paid to her from the Director-General of the BBC, Tim Davie, who described her as a "broadcasting icon" and said that in her work on Woman's Hour she "created a safe space for her audience thanks to her warmth, intelligence and courage", adding, "Her legacy endures in the countless conversations she started, the many issues she championed and the lives she touched."

At an inquest in August 2026, the coroner ruled that her death resulted from bronchopneumonia caused by fractures to her rib and sternum sustained in the crash.

== Charities ==
In November 2007, it was announced Murray had been named patron of British medical research charity Breast Cancer Campaign. She was also patron of the Family Planning Association, vice-president of Parkinson's UK and a supporter of Humanists UK.

== Honours ==
Murray was appointed Officer of the Order of the British Empire (OBE) for services to broadcasting in 1999 and Dame Commander of the Order of the British Empire (DBE) in the 2011 Birthday Honours. In 2007, Murray was awarded a Doctor of Letters (DLitt) honorary degree from the University of St Andrews in recognition of her major contribution to broadcasting, journalism and writing.

In March 2012, Murray was awarded an honorary degree from the University of Salford for contributions to the media industry and to the growing links between the University and its neighbours at Salford Quays. In November 2019, Murray was awarded a Doctor of Letters from the University of Chester for outstanding contribution to journalism and broadcasting.

== Bibliography ==
- Woman's Hour, 50 years of British Women (1996)
- That's My Boy (2003)
- Is It Me, or Is It Hot in Here?: A Modern Woman's Guide to the Menopause (2003)
- Memoirs of a Not So Dutiful 'Daughter' (2009)
- Ten Poems About Dogs (2011)
- My Boy Butch: The heart-warming true story of a little dog who made life worth living again (2011) (ISBN 9780007395323)
- A History of Britain in 21 Women (2016)
- Woman's Hour: Words from Wise, Witty and Wonderful Women (2017)
- A History of the World in 21 Women: A Personal Selection (2018)
- Votes For Women!: The Pioneers and Heroines of Female Suffrage (2018)
- Fat Cow, Fat Chance: The Science and Psychology of Size (2020)
