= End-user development =

Programming by non-specialist computer users

End-user development (EUD) or end-user programming (EUP) refers to activities and tools that allow end-users – people who are not professional software developers – to program computers. People who are not professional developers can use EUD tools to create or modify software artifacts (descriptions of automated behavior) and complex data objects without significant knowledge of a programming language. In 2005 it was estimated (using statistics from the U.S. Bureau of Labor Statistics) that by 2012 there would be more than 55 million end-user developers in the United States, compared with fewer than 3 million professional programmers. Various EUD approaches exist, and it is an active research topic within the field of computer science and human-computer interaction. Examples include natural language programming, spreadsheets, scripting languages (particularly in an office suite or art application), visual programming, trigger-action programming and programming by example.

The most popular EUD tool is the spreadsheet. Due to their unrestricted nature, spreadsheets allow relatively un-sophisticated computer users to write programs that represent complex data models, while shielding them from the need to learn lower-level programming languages. Because of their common use in business, spreadsheet skills are among the most beneficial skills for a graduate employee to have, and are therefore the most commonly sought after. In the United States of America alone, there are an estimated 13 million end-user developers programming with spreadsheets

The programming by example (PbE) approach reduces the need for the user to learn the abstractions of a classic programming language. The user instead introduces some examples of the desired results or operations that should be performed on the data, and the PbE system infers some abstractions corresponding to a program that produces this output, which the user can refine. New data may then be introduced to the automatically created program, and the user can correct any mistakes made by the program in order to improve its definition. Low-code development platforms are also an approach to EUD.

One evolution in this area has considered the use of mobile devices to support end-user development activities. In this case previous approaches for desktop applications cannot be simply reproposed, given the specific characteristics of mobile devices. Desktop EUD environments lack the advantages of enabling end users to create applications opportunistically while on the move.

More recently, interest in how to exploit EUD to support development of Internet of Things applications has increased. In this area trigger-action programming seems a promising approach.

Lessons learned from EUD solutions can significantly influence the software life cycles for commercial software products, in-house intranet/extranet developments and enterprise application deployments.

== Application specific low code development platforms ==
Roughly 40 vendors now offer solutions targeted at end users designed to reduce programming efforts. These solutions do not require traditional programming and may be based around relatively narrow functionality, e.g. contract management, customer relationships management, issue and bug tracking. Often referred to as low code development platforms, web based interactions guide a user to develop an application in as little as 40–80 hours.

== Definition ==
Lieberman et al. propose the following definition:

End-User Development can be defined as a set of methods, techniques, and tools that allow users of software systems, who are acting as non-professional software developers, at some point to create, modify or extend a software artifact.

Ko et al. propose the following definition:

End-user programming is programming to achieve the result of a program primarily for personal, rather [than] public use.

Artifacts defined by end users may be objects describing some automated behavior or control sequence, such as database requests or grammar rules, which can be described with programming paradigms such as programming by demonstration, programming with examples, visual programming, or macro generation. They can also be parameters that choose between alternative predefined behaviors of an application. Other artifacts of end-user development may also refer to the creation of user-generated content such as annotations, which may be or not computationally interpretable (i.e. can be processed by associated automated functions).

== Examples ==
Examples of end-user development include the creation and modification of:

- Animation scripts used by graphic artists to describe characters, environments and how characters move to produce an intended animation
- Configuration files that blur the line between programs and data (e.g., email filters are sequenced lists of criteria and actions to take)
- Example-Centric Programming tools
- Game modifications to introduce users' own characters, environments, etc. — many recent games are distributed with modification in mind
- Interaction scripts used in CRM call centres
- Mobile app development tools such as App Inventor
- Process models used in workflow applications
- Prototypes and domain-specific programs written by businesspeople, engineers, and scientists to demonstrate or test specific theories
- Robot behaviour
- Scientific models used in computer simulation.
- Scripts and macros added to extend or automate office productivity suites and graphics applications.
- Simulations created using application definition software
- Simultaneous editing of many related items either through a batch process specified by the end user or by direct manipulation, like those available in the Lapis text editor and multi edit.
- Spreadsheet models, e.g., used for budgeting, risk analysis, interactive machine learning, or electronic circuit design
- Visual programming in the form of visual languages such as AgentSheets, LabVIEW, Scratch (programming language) or LEGO Mindstorms.
- Web pages - plain HTML or HTML and scripting
- Wikis - a collaborative end-user development process
- Web Mashups in the form of visual languages.
- 3D models created with end-user oriented tools and apps such as Sketchup

== Cost-benefit modeling ==
According to Sutcliffe, EUD essentially outsources development effort to the end user. Because there is always some effort to learn an EUD tool, the users' motivation depends on their confidence that it will empower their work, save time on the job or raise productivity. In this model, the benefits to users are initially based on marketing, demonstrations and word-of-mouth. Once the technology is put into use, experience of actual benefits becomes the key motivator.

This study defines costs as the sum of:

- Technical cost: the price of the technology and the effort to install it
- Learning cost: the time taken to understand the technology
- Development cost: the effort to develop applications using the technology
- Test and debugging cost: the time taken to verify the system

The first and second costs are incurred once during acquisition, whereas the third and fourth are incurred every time an application is developed. Benefits (which may be perceived or actual) are seen as:

- Functionality delivered by the technology
- Flexibility to respond to new requirements
- Usability of applications produced
- Overall quality of the applications produced

== Collaborations in end-user development ==
Many end-user development activities are collaborative in nature, including collaboration between professional developers and end-user developers and collaboration among end-user developers.

Mutual development is a technique where professional developers and end-user developers work together in creating software solutions. In mutual development, the professional developers often “under design” the system and provide the tools to allow the “owners of problems" to create the suitable solution at use time for their needs, objectives and situational contexts. Then the communication between professional developers and end-user developers can often stimulate formalizing ad hoc modifications by the end users into software artifacts, transforming end-user developed solutions into commercial product features with impacts beyond local solutions.

In this collaboration, various approaches such as the Software Shaping Workshop are proposed to bridge the communication gap between professional developers and end-user developers. These approaches often provide translucency according to the social translucence model, enabling everyone in the collaboration to be aware of changes made by others and to be held accountable of their actions because of the awareness.

Besides programming collaboration platforms like GitHub, which are mostly utilized by expert developers due to their steep learning curve, collaborations among end-user developers often take place on wiki platforms where the software artifacts created are shared. End-user development is also often used for creating automation scripts or interactive tutorials for sharing “how-to” knowledge. Examples of such application include CoScripter and HILC. In such applications, user can create scripts for tasks using pseudo-natural language or via programming by demonstration. The users can choose to upload the script to a wiki style repository of scripts. Users on such wikis can browse available scripts and extend existing scripts to support additional parameters, to handle additional conditions or to operate on additional objects.

Online and offline communities of end-user developers have also been formed, where end-user developers can collaboratively solve EUD problems of shared interest or for mutual benefit. In such communities, local experts spread expertise and advice. Community members also provide social support for each other to support the collaborative construction of software.

== Criticism ==
Commentators have been concerned that end users do not understand how to test and secure their applications. Warren Harrison, a professor of computer science at Portland State University, wrote:

It's simply unfathomable that we could expect security... from the vast majority of software applications out there when they're written with little, if any, knowledge of generally accepted good practices such as specifying before coding, systematic testing, and so on.... How many X for Complete Idiots (where "X" is your favorite programming language) books are out there? I was initially amused by this trend, but recently I've become uneasy thinking about where these dabblers are applying their newfound knowledge.

This viewpoint assumes that all end users are equally naive when it comes to understanding software, although Pliskin and Shoval argue this is not the case, that sophisticated end users are capable of end-user development. However, compared with expert programmers, end-user programmers rarely have the time or interest in systematic and disciplined software engineering activities, which makes ensuring the quality of the software artifact produced by end-user development particularly challenging.

In response to this, the study of end-user software engineering has emerged. It is concerned with issues beyond end-user development, whereby end users become motivated to consider issues such as reusability, security and verifiability when developing their solutions.

An alternative scenario is that end users or their consultants employ declarative tools that support rigorous business and security rules at the expense of performance and scalability; tools created using EUD will typically have worse efficiency than those created with professional programming environments. Though separating functionality from efficiency is a valid separation of concerns, it can lead to a situation where end users will complete and document the requirements analysis and prototyping of the tool, without the involvement of business analysts. Thus, users will define the functions required before these experts have a chance to consider the limitations of a specific application or software framework. Senior management support for such end-user initiatives depends on their attitude to existing or potential vendor lock-in.

== See also ==
- Automatic programming
- End-user computing
- Low-code development platforms
- Natural language programming
- Situational application
- Software engineering
- Computer-aided software engineering (CASE)
