= Mouse jiggler =

Motion simulator device for a computer mouse

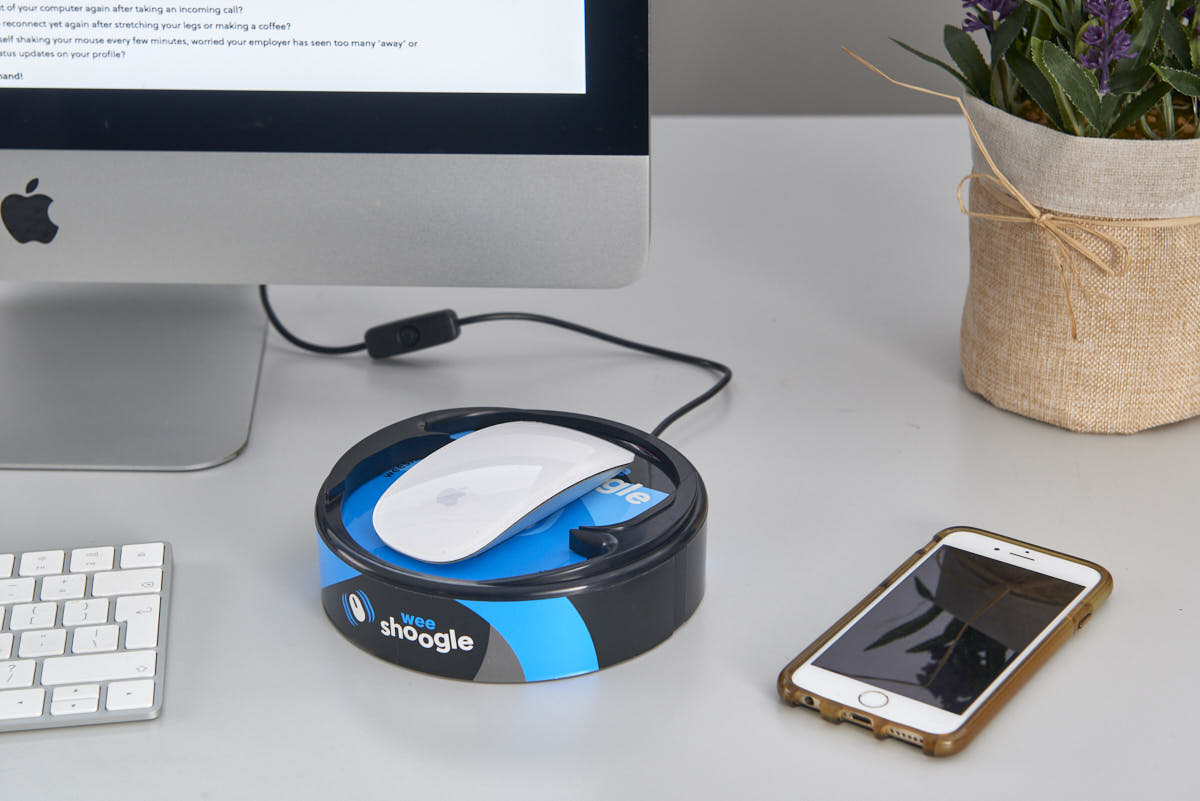
A mechanical mouse jiggler for an Apple mouse.

A mouse jiggler is software or hardware used to simulate or provide movement of a computer mouse. In all cases, it prevents sleep mode, standby mode or the screensaver from activating. Mouse jigglers are also known as mouse movers.

== Software ==
Software driven mouse movers install a program on the user's machine that also moves the mouse cursor across the screen. The computer will generally be able to detect that it is installed and running. Software jigglers are detectable by security and monitoring software.

== Hardware ==
Hardware mouse jigglers come in two general categories: devices which plug into a computer (usually via a USB port) and register as a mouse, then provide digital signals which simulate mouse movement, and devices which do not attach to a computer, but interact with an existing mouse, either physically moving it around or providing falsified input to its sensors. The first category can generally be detected and identified by the computer. The second category is not able to be identified as a separate device by the computer, although specialist software (or human monitoring) may be able to detect that the mouse is being moved in patterns (or randomly) which do not conform to expected human interactions with screen elements.

Some mouse jigglers are videos with geometric patterns, designed to trigger an optical mouse if played on a mobile phone screen placed under the mouse.

Demand for mouse jigglers has been driven by employers or line managers indirectly monitoring their employees who are remote workers as part of productivity theater. However, software exists to detect jigglers.

== See also ==
- Mouse shuffle
