= Programming by example =

Using concrete examples to teach computers behaviors

In computer science, programming by example (PbE), also termed programming by demonstration or more generally as demonstrational programming, is an end-user development technique for teaching a computer new behavior by demonstrating actions on concrete examples. The system records user actions and infers a generalized program that can be used on new examples.

PbE is intended to be easier to do than traditional computer programming, which generally requires learning and using a programming language. Many PbE systems have been developed as research prototypes, but few have found widespread real-world application. More recently, PbE has proved to be a useful paradigm for creating scientific work-flows. PbE is used in two independent clients for the BioMOBY protocol: Seahawk and Gbrowse moby.

Also the programming by demonstration (PbD) term has been mostly adopted by robotics researchers for teaching new behaviors to the robot through a physical demonstration of the task. The usual distinction in the literature between these terms is that in PbE the user gives a prototypical product of the computer execution, such as a row in the desired results of a query; while in PbD the user performs a sequence of actions that the computer must repeat, generalizing it to be used in different data sets. For final users, to automate a workflow in a complex tool (e.g. Photoshop), the most simple case of PbD is the macro recorder.

== See also ==
- Query by Example
- Automated machine learning
- Example-based machine translation
- Inductive programming
- Lapis (text editor), which allows simultaneous editing of similar items in multiple selections created by example
- Programming by demonstration
- Test-driven development
