= WebWatcher =

Surveillance software

- Developer: Awareness Technologies
- Stable release: 8.2.37.1168 (PC) 2.0.27.142 (MAC) 3.6 (Android)
- Operating system: Android 4.0 and up.; iOS version 6.0 and up.; Windows 7; Windows 8; Windows 8.1; Windows 10; macOS; ChromeOS
- Type: Computer monitoring
- License: Proprietary commercial software
- Website: www.webwatcher.com

WebWatcher is a proprietary computer and mobile device monitoring software developed by Awareness Technologies. WebWatcher is compatible with iOS, Android, Windows, ChromeOS and macOS operating systems. WebWatcher Mobile records text messages, call logs, web history, photos, and GPS. WebWatcher for PC and Mac features include email & Instant Message monitoring, keystroke logging, web content filtering and monitoring, and screenshot monitoring. Critics have referred to WebWatcher and other similar pieces of software as "stalkerware".

== History ==
WebWatcher was developed in 2002 initially for uses of counter-terrorism for Windows PCs. The software is now used predominantly by parents to monitor their children's online activities and by employers to monitor the activities of their workers. In 2010, a version of the software was released for BlackBerry and Android devices. In 2012, WebWatcher for Mac was released. WebWatcher for iOS was released in 2014.

== Reception and criticism ==
WebWatcher received the PC Magazine editors' choice award in a 2011 review of Parental Control & Monitoring software. In the article, WebWatcher was referred to as "Heavy-handed" saying: "if you find it necessary to track a child who's engaging in risky activities, WebWatcher will record every detail and even send you instant notification when it encounters certain words." Also, About.com readers named WebWatcher as the "Best Internet Safety Tool" as part of its 2011 Readers' Choice Awards.

Critics have noted that since the software runs stealth on a device, there is an opportunity for the software to be installed illegally. In 2020, TechCrunch and other media outlets described WebWatcher as "stalkerware". Shortly thereafter, Google removed advertisements for WebWatcher from its search results.
