= Wendy Loretto =

British academic

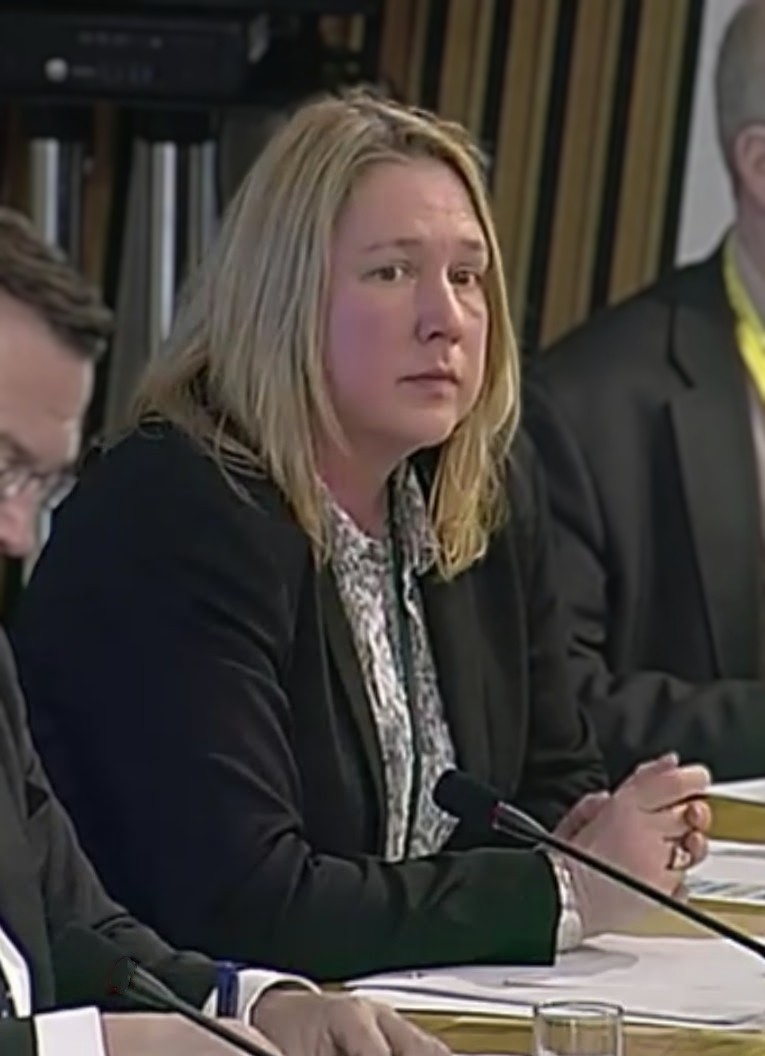
- Education: University of Edinburgh

Wendy Loretto is the head of the Adam Smith Business School at the University of Glasgow, and an expert in later-life employment.

== Education ==
Loretto holds a Bachelor of Commerce degree from the University of Edinburgh. After graduation, she worked as a commercial manager at Marks & Spencer. For three years she worked at the Alcohol Research Group at the University of Edinburgh, where she received her PhD in research on the social and cultural aspects of illicit and legal drug use by young people.

She moved to the University of Glasgow in April 2026, taking up a post as head of the Adam Smith Business School.

== Work ==
Loretto studies the relationship between sex, age and health. She focuses on how gender, health and age interact, particularly in changing attitudes and practices among employees and employers about extending working life.

As of 2026, her work focused on middle-aged and older people in the workforce, especially with respect to financial wellbeing and debt, and health issues such as menopause.
