= Employee monitoring software =

Software to monitor and supervise employee activity

Employee monitoring software, also known as bossware or tattleware, is a means of employee monitoring, and allows company administrators to monitor and supervise all their employee computers from a central location. It is normally deployed over a business network and allows for easy centralized log viewing via one central networked PC. Sometimes, companies opt to monitor their employees using remote desktop software instead.

== Purpose ==
Insiders are the leading cause of data breaches around the globe. IBM found that 60% of all cyberattacks were caused by insiders. In its annual Data Breach Investigations Report, Verizon found an even higher impact, with 82% of all data breaches caused by unsecure or unintentional behaviors of employees. IT organizations have turned to employee monitoring software to help detect and prevent insider threats.

Employee monitoring software is used to supervise employees' performance, prevent illegal activities, avoid confidential info leakage, and catch insider threats. Nowadays employee monitoring software is widely used in technology companies.

== Features ==
An employee monitoring system can monitor almost everything on a computer, such as keystrokes, mouse movements and passwords entered, websites visited, chats in Facebook Messenger, Skype and other social media. A piece of monitoring software can also capture screenshots of mobile activities. E-mail monitoring includes employers having access to records of employee’s e-mails that are sent through the company’s servers. Companies may use keyword searches to natural language processing to analyze e-mails. The administrator can view the logs through a cloud panel, or receive the logs by email.

Other kinds of monitoring include webcam and/or microphone activation, and "invisible" monitoring. Employee monitoring software has been called a form of spyware. During the COVID-19 pandemic, the use of these systems by companies to monitor their employees increased.

== Criticism ==
The Electronic Frontier Foundation (EFF), which originated the term "bossware", has denounced employee monitoring software as a violation of privacy. The Center for Democracy and Technology (CDT) denounced bossware as a threat to the safety and health of employees.

During the COVID-19 pandemic, members of the r/antiwork subreddit shared various mouse jiggler strategies to combat monitoring software intended to monitor the productivity of remote workers.

A study by Reports and Data predicts that the global market for employee remote monitoring software will hit $1.3 billion by 2027.

== See also ==
- Computer surveillance – Monitoring of computer or network activity
- Computer surveillance in the workplace – Use of computers to monitor activity and collect performance data in a workplace
- Job satisfaction – Attitude of a person towards work
- Malware – Malicious software
- Network monitoring – Use of a system that monitors a computer network
- Spyware – Malware that collects and transmits user information without their knowledge
- Trojan horse – Type of malware
- User activity monitoring – Information security practice
