= Productivity theater =

Employees pretending to work

Productivity theater is a form of impression management where an employee acts productively in the workplace, typically by appearing busy or unavailable, without actually being productive.

Following the rise of remote work after COVID-19, productivity theater became a large concern with remote employees who lacked onsite supervision.

== History ==
The term can be linked to other terms such as "performative work". The prevalence of this behavior can be traced back to habits such as presenteeism, and it is believed to be on the rise in many regions of the world, such as Europe and Asia.

== Mouse shuffle ==
The "mouse shuffle" refers to someone continuously moving their computer mouse around to keep their screen active, giving them the appearance of being at work. The mouse can either be physically shuffled by a person or mechanically by a mouse jiggler. The mouse shuffle is useful in workplaces where employees' computer screens are visible to others, like in open-office layouts.

Employees where mouse shuffling is prevalent have increased stress and reduced job satisfaction.
