= Myra Hunter =

English health psychologist

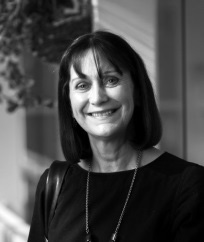
King's College portrait, 2013

Myra Sally Hunter is Professor of Clinical Health Psychology at the Institute of Psychiatry, Psychology and Neuroscience, King's College, London, and a Clinical and Health Psychologist at the South London and Maudsley NHS Foundation Trust.

== Research ==
Hunter's research specialises in the areas of psychological approaches in women's health, cardiology and oncology. She has developed and evaluated cognitive behavioral interventions for women with cardiac chest pain, premenstrual and more recently menopausal problems (including well women and women who have had breast cancer).

She is currently applying the interventions to men who have hot flushes following prostate cancer treatment and is evaluating a brief cognitive behavioral intervention for women who are depressed during pregnancy.

== Positions held ==
She is a member of the UK National Cancer Research Institute Breast Clinical Studies Group (NCRI Breast CSG) that has established a multi-disciplinary working party to evaluate & improve vasomotor symptom management (2013-2015) and Expert Psychology Advisor to the Core DevelopmentGroup for NICE Guidance on Menopause 2013–2015.

== Selected publications ==
- Mann, Eleanor; Smith, Melanie J; Hellier, Jennifer; Balabanovic, Janet A; Hamed, Hisham; Grunfeld, Elizabeth A; Hunter, Myra S (2012). "Cognitive behavioural treatment for women who have menopausal symptoms after breast cancer treatment (MENOS 1): A randomised controlled trial". The Lancet Oncology. 13 (3): 309–318. doi:10.1016/S1470-2045(11)70364-3. PMC 3314999. PMID 22340966.
- Ayers, B; Smith, M; Hellier, J; Mann, E; Hunter, M. S. (2012). "Effectiveness of group and self-help cognitive behavior therapy in reducing problematic menopausal hot flushes and night sweats (MENOS 2): A randomized controlled trial". Menopause. 19 (7): 749–759. doi:10.1097/gme.0b013e31823fe835. PMID 22336748. S2CID 40030145.
- Hunter, MS; Smith, M (October 2013). Managing hot flushes and night sweats: a cognitive behavioural approach to menopause. Routledge. ISBN 978-0-415-62515-9.
- Grunfeld, Elizabeth A.; Hunter, Myra S.; Sikka, Pooja; Mittal, Sangeeta (2005). "Adherence beliefs among breast cancer patients taking tamoxifen". Patient Education and Counseling. 59 (1): 97–102. doi:10.1016/j.pec.2004.10.005. PMID 16198223.
- Burgess, C; Hunter, MS; Ramirez, AJ (2001). "A qualitative study of delay among women reporting symptoms of breast cancer". The British Journal of General Practice. 51 (473): 967–971. PMC 1314188. PMID 11766868.
- Hunter, Myra S.; O'Dea, Irene; Britten, Nicky (1997). "Decision-making and hormone replacement therapy: A qualitative analysis". Social Science & Medicine. 45 (10): 1541–8. doi:10.1016/S0277-9536(97)00091-9. PMID 9351144.
- Hunter, Myra; Philips, Clare (1981). "The experience of headache — an assessment of the qualities of tension headache pain". Pain. 10 (2): 209–19. doi:10.1016/0304-3959(81)90196-2. PMID 7267137. S2CID 46214697.
