= Alistair Sutcliffe =

Alistair G. Sutcliffe (born 1951) is a British scientist and emeritus professor of systems engineering at the School of Informatics of the University of Manchester, specialized in requirements engineering, user interface design and safety-critical systems.

== Life and work ==
Sutcliffe received his MA in Natural Sciences from the University of Cambridge, and his PhD in Ethology from the University of Wales.

Before he started his academic career in the City and Manchester Universities, he had worked in the civil service, the finance industry and the IT industry. He retired from the University of Manchester in October 2011.

His research spans "software engineering, human computer interaction, cognitive and social science, with recent interests in scenario based design, methods for requirements engineering, analysis and modelling complex socio technical systems, visualisation and creative design."

== Publications ==
- — (1988). Jackson system development.
- — (1995) [1988]. Human-computer interface design (2nd ed.).
- — (1994). Business information systems.
- — (2002). User-Centred Requirements Engineering. Springer.
- — (2002). The Domain Theory: Patterns for knowledge and software reuse. Lawrence Erlbaum Associates.
- — (2003). Designing multisensory user interfaces. Lawrence Erlbaum Associates.

Articles, a selection:

- — (2000). "Requirements analysis for socio-technical system design". Information Systems. 25 (3): 213–233. doi:10.1016/S0306-4379(00)00016-8.
