= Workplace =

Physical location where someone works

A workplace is a location where someone works, for their employer or themselves; a place of employment. Such a place can range from a home office to a large office building or factory. For industrialized societies, the workplace is one of the most important social spaces other than the home, constituting "a central concept for several entities: the worker and [their] family, the employing organization, the customers of the organization, and the society as a whole". The development of new communication technologies has led to the development of the virtual workplace and remote work.

== Issues ==
- Sexual harassment: Unwelcome sexual advances, conduct or remarks of a sexual nature which unreasonably interferes with the performance of a person's job or creates an intimidating, hostile, or offensive work environment.
- Kiss up kick down
- Toxic workplace
- Workplace aggression: A specific type of aggression that occurs in the workplace.
- Workplace bullying: The tendency of individuals or groups to use persistent aggressive or unreasonable behavior against a co-worker or subordinate.
- Workplace conflict: A specific type of conflict that occurs in the workplace.
- Workplace culture: The social behaviors and norms in the workplace.
- Workplace counterproductive behaviour: Employee behavior that goes against the goals of an organization.
- Workplace cyber-aggression: Workplace e-mail or text messages that threaten or frighten employees.
- Workplace democracy: The application of democracy in all its forms to the workplace.
- Workplace deviance: Deliberate or intentional desire to cause harm to an organization.
- Workplace discrimination: Discrimination in hiring, promotion, job assignment, termination, and compensation.
- Workplace diversity: Theory that in a global marketplace, a company that employs a diverse workforce is better able to understand the demographics of the marketplace it serves.
- Workplace emotions: Emotions in the workplace play a large role in how an entire organization communicates within itself and to the outside world.
- Workplace employee factors leading to job promotion.
- Laziness in the workplace which could lead to Industrial accidents or other things.
- Workplace empowerment: Provides employees with opportunities to make their own decisions with regard to their tasks.
- Workplace evaluation: A tool employers use to review the performance of an employee.
- Feminisation of the workplace: Trend towards greater employment of women, and of men willing and able to operate with these more 'feminine' modes of interaction.
- Workplace relationships: Directly related to several other area of study including cohesion, job satisfaction, organizational commitment and intention to leave.
- Workplace gender inequality: Relates to wage discrimination and career advancement.
- Workplace gossip: Idle talk or rumor, especially about the personal or private affairs of others.
- Workplace harassment: Offensive, belittling or threatening behavior directed at an individual worker or a group of workers.
- Workplace health surveillance: The removal of the causative factors of disease.
- Workplace hazard controls for COVID-19: Measures employed to control the spread of COVID-19
- Workplace humor: Comedy that revolves around the inner workings of various jobs.
- Workplace incivility: Low-intensity deviant workplace behavior such as rudeness, discourtesy and displaying a lack of regard for others.
- Workplace intervention: Scheme to improve both organizational and individual health as well as help workers manage job stress.
- Workplace jargon: Highly specialized terminology or needlessly complicated and obfuscated phrases sometimes used by managers or colleagues.
- Workplace listening: a type of active listening that is generally employed in a professional environment.
- Mobbing: similar concept to workplace bullying.
- Workplace morale: Workplace events play a large part in changing employee morale, such as heavy layoffs, the cancellation of overtime, canceling benefits programs, and the lack of union representation.
- Workplace menopause: The impact menopause symptoms can have on attendance and performance in the workplace.
- Workplace narcissism
- Workplace phobia: An actual or imagined confrontation with the workplace or certain stimuli at the workplace causes a prominent anxiety reaction in a person.
- Workplace politics: The use of one's individual or assigned power within an employing organization for the purpose of obtaining advantages beyond one's legitimate authority.
- Workplace privacy: Employees typically must relinquish some of their privacy while at the workplace, but how much can be a contentious issue.
- Workplace probation: A status given to new employees of a company or business.
- Workplace psychopathy: Psychopaths can do enormous damage when they are positioned in senior management roles
- Workplace revenge: Refers to the general action of purposeful retaliation within the workplace in an attempt to seek justice.
- Workplace sabotage: When disgruntled workers damage or destroy equipment or interfere with the smooth running of a workplace.
- Workplace safety: Occupational safety and health is a category of management responsibility in places of employment.
- Workplace spirituality: A grassroots movement with individuals seeking to live their faith and/or spiritual values in the workplace.
- Workplace strategy: The dynamic alignment of an organization's work patterns with the work environment to enable peak performance and reduce costs.
- Workplace stress: The harmful physical and emotional response that occurs when there is a poor match between job demands and the capabilities, resources, or needs of the worker.
- Workplace surveillance: Businesses use workplace surveillance as a way of monitoring the activities of their employees.
- Workplace swearing: In the UK, swearing in the workplace can be an act of gross misconduct under certain circumstances.
- Professional development: Skills and knowledge attained for both personal development and career advancement.
- Workplace violence Violence that originates from employees or employers and threatens employers and/or other employees.
- Workplace wellness: Program offered by some employers to support behavior conducive to the health of employees.

== See also ==
- Corporation
- Employment
- Factory
- Office
- Organization
- Whistleblower
