= WBOR =

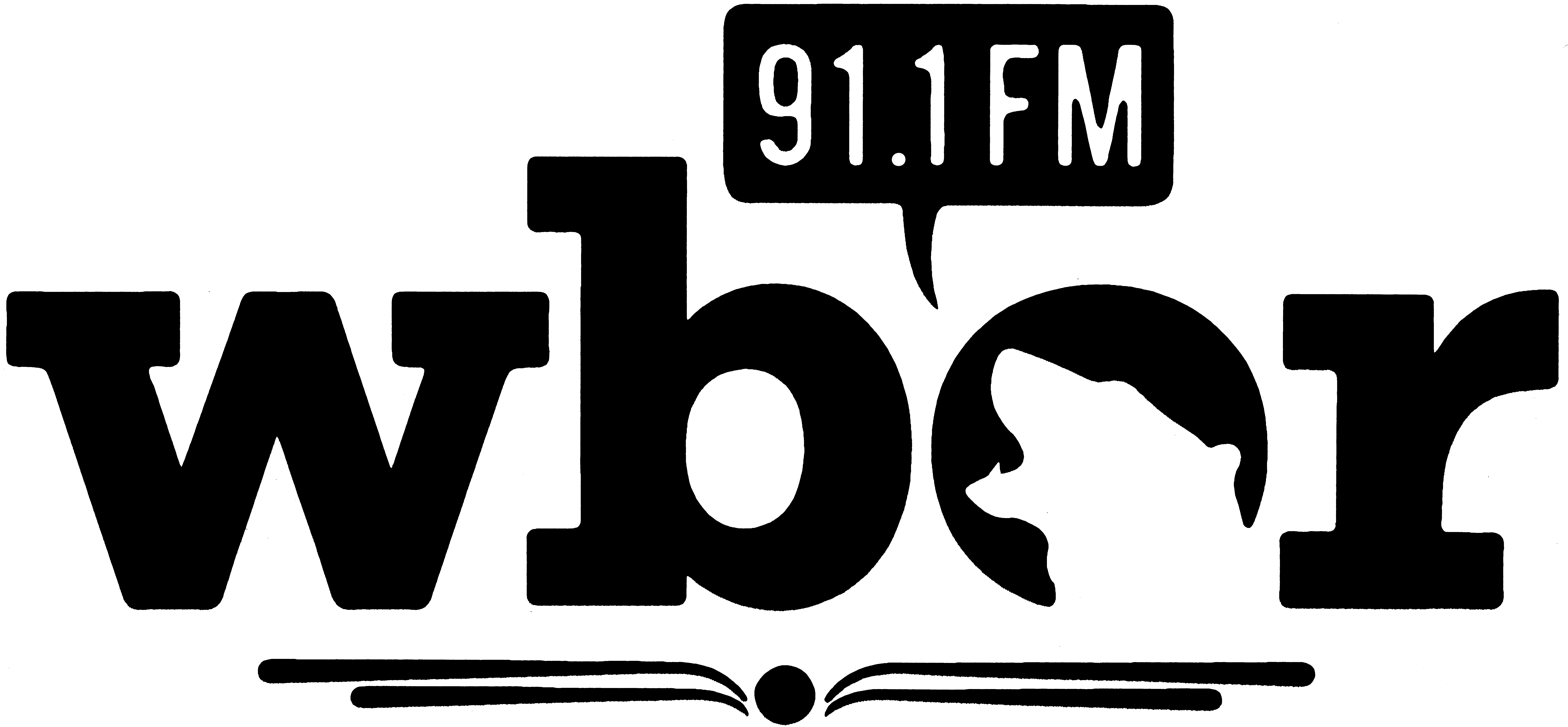
- Brunswick, Maine; United States
- Broadcast area: Mid Coast
- Frequency: 91.1 MHz

Programming
- Format: College radio

Ownership
- Owner: Bowdoin College; (Bowdoin College Board of Trustees)

History
- Founded: 1948
- First air date: February 20, 1957; 69 years ago
- Former call signs: BOTA (1941–1951), WBOA (1951–1956)
- Former frequencies: 820 AM
- Call sign meaning: "Bowdoin-on-Radio"

Technical information
- Licensing authority: FCC
- Facility ID: 66276
- Class: A
- ERP: 300 watts
- HAAT: 47 meters (154 ft)
- Transmitter coordinates: 43°54′34″N 69°57′43″W

Links
- Public license information: Public file; LMS
- Webcast: Listen Live
- Website: wbor.org

WBOR (91.1 FM) is the student-run, noncommercial, college radio station licensed to Bowdoin College in Brunswick, Maine, United States. The station broadcasts from Coles Tower on the Bowdoin College campus. DJs are predominately full-time Bowdoin students; however, many staff and faculty members, and community members host weekly shows. WBOR can be heard throughout the Mid Coast area.

== History ==
At least as far back as March 1941, Bowdoin students and faculty have sporadically hosted programs recorded on campus and later broadcast through Portland's WCSH, Lewiston's WCOU, Augusta's WRDO, and Bangor's WLBZ. These programs usually consisted of play readings, faculty interviews, and live vocal music from the college Glee Club and the Meddiebempsters.

In the late 1940s, Bowdoin began a program entitled “Bowdoin-on-the-air” (BOTA), where students would record radio broadcasts, which Portland's WGAN would broadcast semi-regularly. In March 1948, BOTA formed the Radio Drama Workshop to organize the writing, directing, and production of student radio dramas.

In 1947, due to the popularity of BOTA, President Kenneth Sills formed a committee to look into the possibility of building an AM radio station on campus. After a $4,000 gift from the Class of 1924 was secured, the Bowdoin Orient offices on the second floor of Moulton Union (above the Lancaster lounge) were transformed into a radio station. The new studio opened in December 1949, equipped with an AM transmitter and a direct phone line to WGAN in Portland.

On April 25, 1948, BOTA broadcast its first original radio drama created by the workshop. The drama, entitled "The Bowdoin Plan", was written by Herbert L. Gould, class of 1950. The Bowdoin Orient lauded it as “the most ambitious thing yet attempted by the group.” A recording of the play was sent to all New England colleges with radio stations, as an example of what a college station can accomplish.

At 10:15 pm on February 16, 1949, a pre-recorded interview with Red Sox shortstop Johnny Pesky was broadcast by BOTA on WGAN. BOTA made the first test of a new AM transmitter on March 22, 1950. A live broadcast of an experimental program consisting of campus news and music took place at 7:45 pm on 820 AM. Due to the weakness of the AM signal, BOTA continued to broadcast through Portland's WGAN for another year.

In the spring of 1950, Bowdoin-on-Air became a weekly fixture in WGAN's programming, having aired every Sunday at 1:45 PM. Through their direct phone line, BOTA could broadcast on WGAN live from their Moulton Union studio. The first live broadcast via this connection was a performance of William Butler Yeats' play, A Pot O' Broth, aired on April 16, 1950. The following fall, programming was expanded to half an hour, with an additional “experimental” four-hour evening show featuring news, sports, interviews, dramatic skits, classical “music to study by,” and jazz “music not to study by.”

At 7 pm on May 9, 1951, BOTA began officially broadcasting at 820 AM. In conjunction with the official switch, BOTA changes its name to WBOA (Bowdoin-on-Air), their official FCC station name.

In December 1956, WBOA reregistered with the FCC as an FM station and was granted the broadcast frequency of 91.1 MHz. With the switch to FM, WBOA changes its name to WBOR (Bowdoin-on-Radio). WBOR's first campus-wide FM broadcast was heard on February 20, 1957. Previously, WBOA could only be heard in freshmen dorms within a few hundred feet of the station.

On March 13, 1960, WBOR recorded a Pete Seeger concert at Bowdoin's Pickard Theater. The Smithsonian Institution would later release the entire recording in a two-CD set and on streaming platforms. In the same year, WBOR interviewed actress Bette Davis on air.

On May 6, 1964, WBOR recorded a speech given by Martin Luther King at the First Parish Church in Brunswick. WBOR's all-day coverage of Vietnam War moratorium activities took place on October 5, 1969. After a two-year battle with local radio and TV stations, on October 19, 1982, the FCC granted WBOR permission to increase its signal strength to 300 watts.

Over the summer of 1995, WBOR moved into a newly renovated space in the basement of the Dudley Coe Health Center. In the fall of 2006, WBOR came under heavy fire from the FCC when attempting to renew its license due to missing information from quarterly station reports. A "Save WBOR" campaign was mounted, and over 600 letters from students, faculty, alumni, and community members, including Senator Olympia Snowe, were sent to the FCC office to support WBOR, citing its prominent role in the Mid Coast Maine community. The FCC was swayed and decided to renew WBOR's license, letting the station off with a fine.

As of January 6, 2025, after 29 years in the Dudley Coe building, the studio was shut down to relocate to the Coles Tower.

In May 2025, Neal Agarwal (creator of Infinite Craft, The Password Game, and Stimulation Clicker) released the game Internet Roadtrip, in which players vote in real time to determine the path of an imaginary car through Google Street View imagery. The game includes an FM radio feature, and while in Brunswick, the players tuned to WBOR. The station's hosts eventually became aware of the game and established communication with the players, played their song requests, and acknowledged the game on air.

== Event history ==
WBOR has a long history as a major event promoter for the Mid Coast Maine area. WBOR has hosted (and in some cases recorded) performances by:

- Pete Seeger (March 13, 1960)
- Galaxie 500 (April 5, 1991)
- Uncle Tupelo (March 1994)
- Bedhead (1996)
- The Magnetic Fields (April 9, 1999)
- The Secret Machines (January 29, 2005)
- The Hold Steady (March 31, 2006)
- Dr. Dog (November 16, 2007)
- Broken Social Scene (October 25, 2008)
- Wale (April 3, 2009)
- Deerhunter (September 10, 2009)
- The Morning Benders (November 2010)
- Lady Lamb (November 2010)
- Surfer Blood (November 4, 2011)
- Kreayshawn (November 4, 2011)
- RJD2 (November 2, 2012)
- The Antlers (February 22, 2013)
- Chain Gang of 1974 (November 8, 2013)
- MURS (March 28, 2014)
- Wavves (October 18, 2014)
- Shabazz Palaces (2015/2016)
- Yonatan Gat (March 4, 2017)
- Xenia Rubinos (September 23, 2017)
- Kemba (October 21, 2017)
- Crumb (November 11, 2017)
- Duckwrth (February 18, 2018)
- Julie Byrne (April 6, 2018)
- Milo / R.A.P. Ferreira (October 26, 2018)
- Melt (April 10, 2022)
- Weakened Friends (November 17, 2022)
- Maude Latour (February 25, 2023)
- Social House (February 25, 2023)
- Lady Lamb (April 29, 2023)
- Vundabar (September 8, 2023)
- Juice (American band) (May 10, 2024)

== Notable alumni ==
- Cynthia McFadden, class of 1978 — co-anchor for the ABC television network's Nightline and Primetime Live programs.
- Andrew Serwer, class of 1981 — Editor-at-large of Barron's, former editor-in-chief @ Yahoo Finance
- Daniel B. Spears, class of 1981 — Vice President for Industry Relations and licensing at Broadcast Music, Inc. (BMI)
- Kary Antholis, class of 1984 — academy-award winning documentary filmmaker and vice president of HBO
- Steve Laffey, class of 1984 — mayor of Cranston, Rhode Island, from 2003 to 2007
- Joe Beninati, class of 1987 — ESPN and NBCSN sportscaster
- Paul D. Miller, aka DJ Spooky, that Subliminal Kid, class of 1992 — DJ, electronic musician, composer, multimedia artist, author, and professor of music at the European Graduate School
- Matt Roberts, class of 1993 — Emmy-Winning writer for the 64th Annual Tony Awards, executive producer for the Late Show with David Letterman, head writer for the Late Late Show with James Corden.
- Jennifer C. Lilly, class of 1996 — editor and production manager, known for Eighth Grade (2018) and Master of None (2015)
- Katie Benner, class of 1999 — New York Times reporter and Pulitzer Prize recipient
- Hari Kondabolu, class of 2004 — stand-up comic, actor, and filmmaker
- Evan Gershkovich, class of 2014 — reporter at The Wall Street Journal covering Russia

== See also ==
- Campus radio
- List of college radio stations in the United States
