= Candy Box! =

2013 video game

- Developer: aniwey
- Series: Candy Box!
- Platform: Browser
- Release: WW: April 2013
- Genres: Incremental, role-playing
- Mode: Single-player

Candy Box! is an incremental online text-based role-playing game that runs in a web browser. It was developed by a 19-year-old French student using the pseudonym "aniwey" and released in April 2013. Candy Box! uses ASCII art for the visuals.

A sequel, Candy Box 2, was released on October 24, 2013.

== Gameplay ==
Candy Box! starts with only a save button and a candy counter.

The game revolves around candies, which players begin to receive at a rate of one per second; however, this number may increase with further gameplay. Gameplay appears very sparse initially, but options appear as the player performs actions. For example, candy can be eaten or used to purchase items. Players can eventually undertake quests and kill monsters in order to gain candy. By performing quests, the player obtains items which can be accessed in their inventory.

== Development ==
Candy Box! was developed over a period of two months by independent developer "aniwey", a 19-year-old student from Caen, France. It was released in April 2013.

== Reception ==
Kotaku noted that "Candy Box!'s curious combination of ASCII 'graphics', role-playing elements and resource management has caught on with hundreds of thousands." According to Mashable, the "charming ASCII art style belies a very deep game that can quickly get addictive". PC Gamer editor Shaun Prescott found the game particularly addictive, describing it as "Cow Clicker as RPG." Justin Davis of IGN stated that, together with A Dark Room and Cookie Clicker, Candy Box! has become one of the most well-known incremental games. Rock, Paper, Shotgun named Candy Box! number 21 of The 50 Best Free Games on PC in 2016. During the 17th Annual D.I.C.E. Awards, the Academy of Interactive Arts & Sciences nominated Candy Box! for "Casual Game of the Year".

== Legacy ==
A sequel, titled Candy Box 2, was released on October 24, 2013. The source code of Candy Box 2, written in TypeScript, was released under the GPLv3. It received broad public reception and was recommended in a PC World review in October 2013 with the words "Play this right now". Julien "Orteil" Thiennot, developer of Cookie Clicker, one of the most popular idle games of all time, has cited Candy Box as one of his main inspirations.
