= Ensign =

Ensign most often refers to:

- Ensign (flag), a flag flown on a vessel to indicate nationality
- Ensign (rank), a navy (and former army) officer rank

Ensign or The Ensign may also refer to:

== Places ==
- Ensign, Alberta, Alberta, Canada
- Ensign, Kansas
- Ensign Lake, a lake in Minnesota
- Ensign Peak, Utah
- Ensign Township, Michigan
  - Ensign, Michigan, an unincorporated community
- Ensign Township, North Dakota (near Glenburn)

== People ==
=== Given name ===
- Ensign Cottrell (1888–1947), American baseball player
- Ensign Dickinson (1819–1897), American politician
- Ensign H. Kellogg (1812–1882), American politician

=== Surname ===
- Ensign (surname)

== Transportation ==
- Pearson Ensign, a class of full-keel sailboats
- USS Ensign (SP-1051), a United States Navy patrol boat in commission from 1917 to 1919
- Armstrong Whitworth Ensign, a class of British airliner, and the name of the first example
- Ensignbus, a bus company in England
- Ensign Manufacturing Company, a defunct railroad car manufacturing company in West Virginia

== Music ==
- Ensign (band), a hardcore punk band
  - Ensign (EP), the band's eponymous 1996 release
- Ensign Records, British record label, now part of EMI

== Newspapers and magazines ==
- The Ensign (newspaper), a newspaper published by Allied Press serving Gore, New Zealand
- Ensign (LDS magazine), a former magazine of The Church of Jesus Christ of Latter-day Saints
- The Ensign (USPS magazine), the official magazine of the United States Power Squadrons

== Other uses ==
- Ensign Racing, a defunct Formula One team
- Ensign Energy Services, a Calgary-based oil well drilling and servicing company
- The Ensign (video game), a text-based iOS video game
- Ensign, the botanical author abbreviation for Margaret Ruth Ensign
