= Zero-player game =

Game that has no sentient players

A zero-player game or no-player game is a simulation game that has no sentient players.

== Types ==
There are various different types of games that can be considered "zero-player".

=== Determined by initial state ===
A game that evolves as determined by its initial state, requiring no further input from humans is considered a zero-player game.

Cellular automaton games that are determined by initial conditions. Conway's Game of Life is an example of this.

Progress Quest is another example, in the game the player sets up an artificial character, and afterwards the game plays itself with no further input from the player. Godville is a similar game that took inspiration from Progress Quest. In the game, the player is a god that can communicate with a non-player character hero. However, the game can progress with no interaction from the player.

Incremental games, sometimes called idle games or clicker games, are games which do require some player intervention near the beginning but may become zero-player at higher levels. As an example, Cookie Clicker requires that players click cookies manually before purchasing assets to click cookies in the place of the player independently.

=== AI vs AI games ===
In computer games, the term refers to programs that use artificial intelligence rather than human players; for example some fighting, sports, and real-time strategy games can be put into zero-player mode where multiple AIs can play against each other. Humans may have a challenge in designing the AI and giving it sufficient skill to play the game well, but the actual evolution of the game has no human intervention.

== See also ==
- Single-player game
- Two-player game
- Multiplayer video game
- Incremental game
