= Godville =

- Developer: Dmitry Kosinov; Mikhail Platov
- Platform: Android; iOS; web browser; Windows Phone
- Release: 2007
- Genre: God game
- Mode: Zero-player

Godville (Russian: Годвилль) is a mobile and desktop browser zero-player role-playing video game developed by Mikhail Platov and Dmitry Kosinov. It was released as a Russian website in 2007 and as a mobile game in English on July 18, 2010. In the game, the player controls a character known as the god, who interacts with a character called the hero. The hero progresses in the video game without interaction with the player's god character. Reception to the game was positive, with the focus on its gameplay.

== Gameplay ==
Godville is a zero-player game, which means it does not require interaction from the player for the game to progress, though it does require some setup. In the game, there is the hero-character, who is a non-player character, and there is the god-character, who is played by the player. The hero is a religious fanatic who uses a diary to communicate with the god, and occasionally needs a sign of the god's existence; the player uses the god-character to influence the hero positively or negatively using rewards and punishments, and sometimes direct communication. The hero can have a pet companion. After a period of time playing the game, the game enables the player to review the most-important events the hero has participated in since the last time the player checked the game.

The game is also a role-playing game, meaning the hero will wander his world, defeat monsters, find and use treasure and items, and sometimes lose to monsters and unfriendly non-player characters. The player names the hero. Over time, the hero levels up and learns special skills, and has his own personality as a result of his adventuring, as well as his interaction with the god. Occasionally, the hero will be philosophical. The game provides some items with enhanced abilities which the hero can use only with the god's involvement; the hero will sell these items even if they do "have some marvelous effect". Limited player-vs-player interaction is provided as the god can have the hero duel other heroes. The hero who wins takes some coins from the losing hero as well as some of the losing hero's items. The god can somewhat influence these duels, but sometimes the god's attempt aids the opposing god's hero instead of his own.

The game was free-to-play at release and connected to the Internet. The game was not supported by ads at release, and the developers were supported by their full-time jobs. Once their characters reach level 10, players can suggest updates to the game, which are then voted upon by the community of players for subsequent inclusion. Most of the phrases in the game are made and selected by the community.

== Development and release ==
The game was developed by Dmitry Kosinov and Mikhail Platov, where Kosinov focused on technical issues and Platov the gameplay issues. They attribute their community of players as co-designers, from which the designers took feedback on direction and feature set.

The designers found Progress Quest in 2003, which they say they "immediately loved" and which Edge called a "clear progeny". Besides Progress Quest, the game was inspired by Terry Pratchett's Small Gods. It is named Godville because the name sounded good in both Russian and English and because it was appropriate for the game. FarmVille did not exist then. From 2003 to 2007, they worked on the ideas for the game in their spare time, including a prototype version in English. The web browser version eventually released in 2007 was in Russian because it was their native language, which would allow them to write better jokes. The developers self-describe that version as "barely-playable", but they continued developing the game another three years. Knowledge of the Russian version spread by word of mouth, eventually having thousands of players. This version had no graphics or sound in 2010.

In early 2010 the developers started work on the English version, due to demand from Russian-speakers who wanted to show it to their English-speaking friends and because the developers wanted to work on an English version again. Russian-speakers helped with the initial translation. The English version of the website was not fully-featured in 2010, but new content was added daily. The developers released the game for iPhone and iPod in July 2010, and by August it had over 20,000 downloads. Based on the user response, the developers released an iPad version with the 2nd version of the iPhone app in September. The developers subsequently released an Android version in March 2011, expanded Web browser access to the English version in April 2011, released a Windows Phone version in July 2013, and an Apple Watch version in 2015.

== Reception ==
On its English release, Eli Hodapp, editor-in-chief of TouchArcade, said that the game "sounds a little stupid" but that "it's surprisingly amusing without needing to actually do anything at all". James Stephanie Sterling, writing for Destructoid, called Godville "a fun, funny, incredibly clever little game"; she later added in GamesRadar that it was "one of the most compelling, engaging, and addictive little bits of software out there". In 2012, Edge Online called the game "darkly rewarding in its meaningless levelling and incessant battles even before you take into account the smart writing", and was similarly addicted to "the promises of numbers that get larger and larger over time". In 2014, The New York Times said the game "has a wickedly funny side, and it will light up your imagination." Multiple reviewers identified the game as satirizing religion, the role-playing game genre, the massively-multiplayer online game genre, and video games in general; the developers also included "internet memes and ordinary day to day things".

Hodapp said that the original adventures the character went on were repetitive, but that the developers had implemented a number of excellent community suggestions within the first month. The lack of control over the hero was appealing. He originally thought the game was novel and didn't expect it to last, but was surprised that he was still interested in the game years later, and likens checking the game to checking his email or Twitter feed. GamePro identified typos in the content, likely due to the developers not speaking English natively, but that community suggestions continued to help improve the game. Bogost was unimpressed with the monetization and the use of god powers to influence the game, and was disappointed that the god could interact at all, but suggested that some interaction was necessary for Godville to be a game rather than a reading work.

NDTV compared the game favorably to Godus, another video game in the genre. Due to the idle game genre's "ease of access", Godville is cited as one game providing for "a variety of player preferences". Reviewers approved of the game on mobile platforms, including iPod Touch, iPhone, Apple Watch, and Android. It was also included in Mashable's "11 Facebook Games You're Embarrassed to Admit You Play" list.
