= Oil God =

2006 video game

- Developer(s): Persuasive Games
- Release: 2006
- Genre(s): Strategy game
- Mode(s): Single-player

Oil God is a 2006 newsgame created by Persuasive Games dealing with the relationship between the gas prices at the pump and the way the oil industry works. It has been likened to a simpler version of the strategy game Black & White. The lead designer was Ian Bogost. The reception was mediocre; James Ransom-Wiley of Engadget called it "a crude experience, pumped with superficial cynicism [that] fails to deliver "news" about the real world oil biz."
