= Stimulation Clicker =

2025 video game

- Developer: Neal Agarwal
- Producer: Liz Ryan
- Artists: Pixel Chop; Sketch Studio
- Writer: Alex Alvarez
- Composers: Austin Taylor; Jon Kaur
- Platform: Web
- Release: January 6, 2025
- Genre: Clicker
- Mode: Single-player

Stimulation Clicker is a 2025 clicker game created by Neal Agarwal. In the game, the player clicks a button to earn Stimulation Points, which they can spend on upgrades to gain more points. The game was released on his website, neal.fun, on January 6, 2025. Stimulation Clicker garnered a positive reception, with praise for its chaotic gameplay and satirical take on the modern internet.

== Gameplay ==
In Stimulation Clicker, the player starts with a button instructing players to click it. Each click earns them one Stimulation Point, and they may spend their points on upgrades to gain more points. Themed around overstimulation, upgrades include a true crime podcast, gameplay footage of Subway Surfers, Duolingo questions, and DVD screensaver logos that move across the screen. Once the player purchases every upgrade, they unlock an end credits scene where they arrive at an ocean. The player's progress cannot be saved.

== Development ==
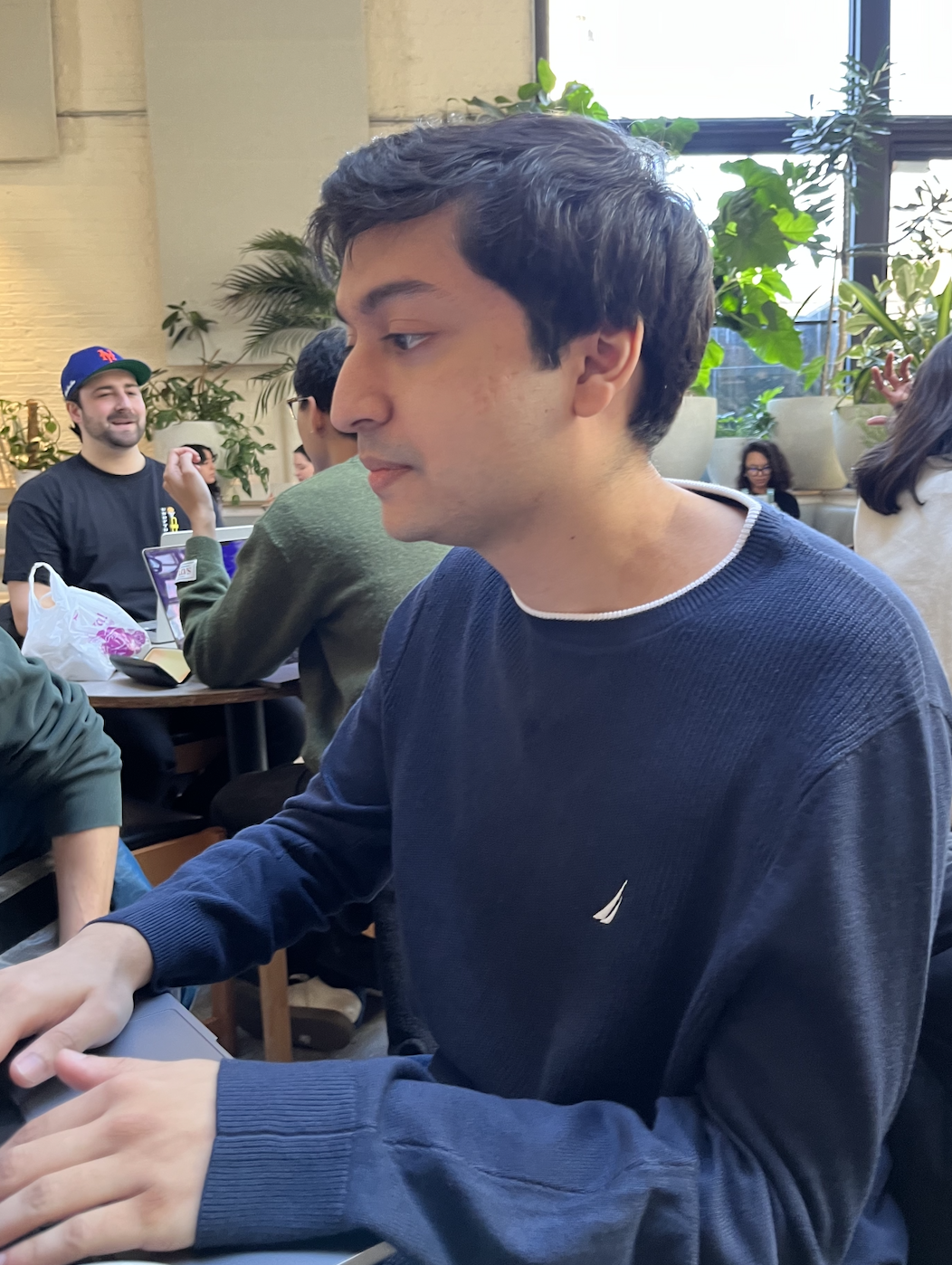
Neal Agarwal, the game's creator, in 2024

Developed by Neal Agarwal, the creator of The Password Game (2023), Draw a Perfect Circle (2023), and Infinite Craft (2024), Stimulation Clicker was released on January 6, 2025, for his website, neal.fun. Agarwal first conceived of the idea during the COVID-19 lockdowns, claiming he wanted to capture "the experience of being terminally online".

The development took four months and was inspired by Cookie Clicker and Upgrade Complete!. It included hiring voice actors for an original 45 minute podcast; recording new lines from Jeff Steitzer, the voice of the multiplayer announcer in the Halo franchise; and including specially recorded segments from streamers and influencers.

== Reception ==
Multiple reviewers found the game chaotic. Kris Holt of Engadget, likening it to Clickolding, described Stimulation Clicker as a "funny, bruising commentary" on how websites keep users engaged, while Maddy Myers of Polygon felt it was a "terrifying art project". Yair Rosenberg of The Atlantic thought the game was "a remarkable rendering of how digital life has gone off the rails." In PC Gamer, Jonathan Bolding opined that while not being a very deep commentary, it was "a useful one."

== See also ==
- Incremental game
- Infinite Craft
- Internet Roadtrip
- The Password Game
