= Egg, Inc. =

2016 video game

- App Icon
- Developer: Auxbrain
- Publisher: Auxbrain
- Platforms: iOS; Android
- Release: iOS: July 14, 2016; Android: July 14, 2016
- Genre: Idle clicker
- Mode: Single-player

Egg, Inc. is a 2016 idle clicker game developed and published by American studio Auxbrain Inc on Android and iOS devices. The game takes place in a future in which eggs unlock the secrets of the universe. The main objective in the game is to make the most profitable egg farm.

== Gameplay ==
The UI features a size-adjustable red button with a chicken on it. When the button is pressed or held, chickens are released and therefore, money is made from their eggs that they produce. This money can be used to further upgrade the egg farm by doing lab research which can increase the value of the eggs, the speed at which they are produced, and the size of the player's distribution fleet. To increase the profitability of the farm, the player can construct bigger spaces (called hen houses) to house more chickens, buy better vehicles to transport more eggs and build more grain silos to allow the farm to run by itself for longer periods of time. Alongside common research which is only purchasable with in-game money, players can perform epic research which is only purchasable with golden eggs. Epic research is permanent, meaning it will never reset even if the player prestiges or upgrades their egg. Epic research exclusively allows players to increase the boost of soul eggs or eggs of prophecy, as well as permanently decrease the price of hen houses and vehicles.

Screenshot from the game

Players can also earn in-game currency by watching advertisement videos. Every few minutes, a white truck will come by and drop off a package containing money (the value of which is scaled up as the farm value increases) or golden eggs. Additionally, a drone will fly across the screen on occasion. If the player taps on the drone, it will drop to the ground and reward the player with either money or golden eggs. When the player's farm value reaches a certain threshold, the player can upgrade to a new egg, restarting, but with each egg selling for a higher base price (except for the Enlightenment egg). Later egg types, trucks, and hen houses are themed as being futuristic.

Golden eggs are the premium currency; while they can be earned by playing, they can also be bought with real money, and they do not reset when upgrading the egg type or prestiging. With the aforementioned currency, the player can either buy temporary power-ups, like unlimited chickens when you tap for ten minutes or double revenue for a starting 2 hours, or can get epic research, which is used to upgrade other aspects, such as the chance of getting a rare (elite) drone, or increasing the amount of time for double revenue.

There is also an option to "prestige". This sends the player back to the first egg, losing all cash and progress, but keeping golden eggs, soul eggs, eggs of prophecy, epic research, and the pro permit (if purchased). However, when the player prestiges, they earn soul eggs that boost egg values by a certain percentage. The number of soul eggs earned in a prestige is based on value of the farm.

== Reception ==
Gamezebo gave the game 4 out of 5 stars praising the game as being "satisfying to say the least", "ideal for short or long bursts of gaming" and "slow burning soon turns into compelling" while criticizing it as "ultimately a little pointless" and being a little plain.
