= Infinite Craft =

2024 video game

- Developer: Neal Agarwal
- Platforms: Web, iOS, Android
- Release: Web: January 31, 2024; iOS: April 27, 2024; Android: May 21, 2024
- Genre: Sandbox
- Mode: Single-player

Infinite Craft is a 2024 sandbox game developed by Neal Agarwal. In the game, players combine various AI-generated elements to form new ones. It was released on January 31, 2024, on Agarwal's website neal.fun, followed by iOS on April 30, 2024, and Android on May 21, 2024. The game received wide popularity and a positive reception from critics, who praised the game's unpredictable nature. When it was released, it was very popular on Twitch and YouTube.

== Gameplay ==
In Infinite Craft, the player can craft various elements using previous ones gained.

Infinite Craft is a web-based sandbox game. The main aspect of the game are elements, which represent an idea, object, or concept. The player starts with the four classical elements (water, fire, wind, and earth) and uses various combinations of two elements to form new ones. For example, Plant and Smoke produces Incense, which creates Perfume when combined with itself. All elements crafted by the player are saved to the sidebar, where the player can also search for crafted elements by their name.

The game uses Llama 2 and Mistral AI, a large language model, to create new elements and assign emojis. When a player combines two elements on the website, the game checks from its database if these two elements have already been combined before—if they have not, the generative AI creates a new element which is then saved to the database. This is done to reduce repeated queries, and to ensure that the same pair of elements always outputs the same result for all players. If a player is the first person to discover an element, the game labels it as a "First Discovery".

As the game can theoretically go forever and has a potentially infinite number of possible elements, there is no defined goal. Players have created databases of recipes, and some YouTubers have attempted to speedrun the game. Agarwal has said that Llama is "not quite as smart" as ChatGPT. A content filter is in place that filters offensive results, but there are still occasionally incoherent results, which players find amusing.

== Development and release ==
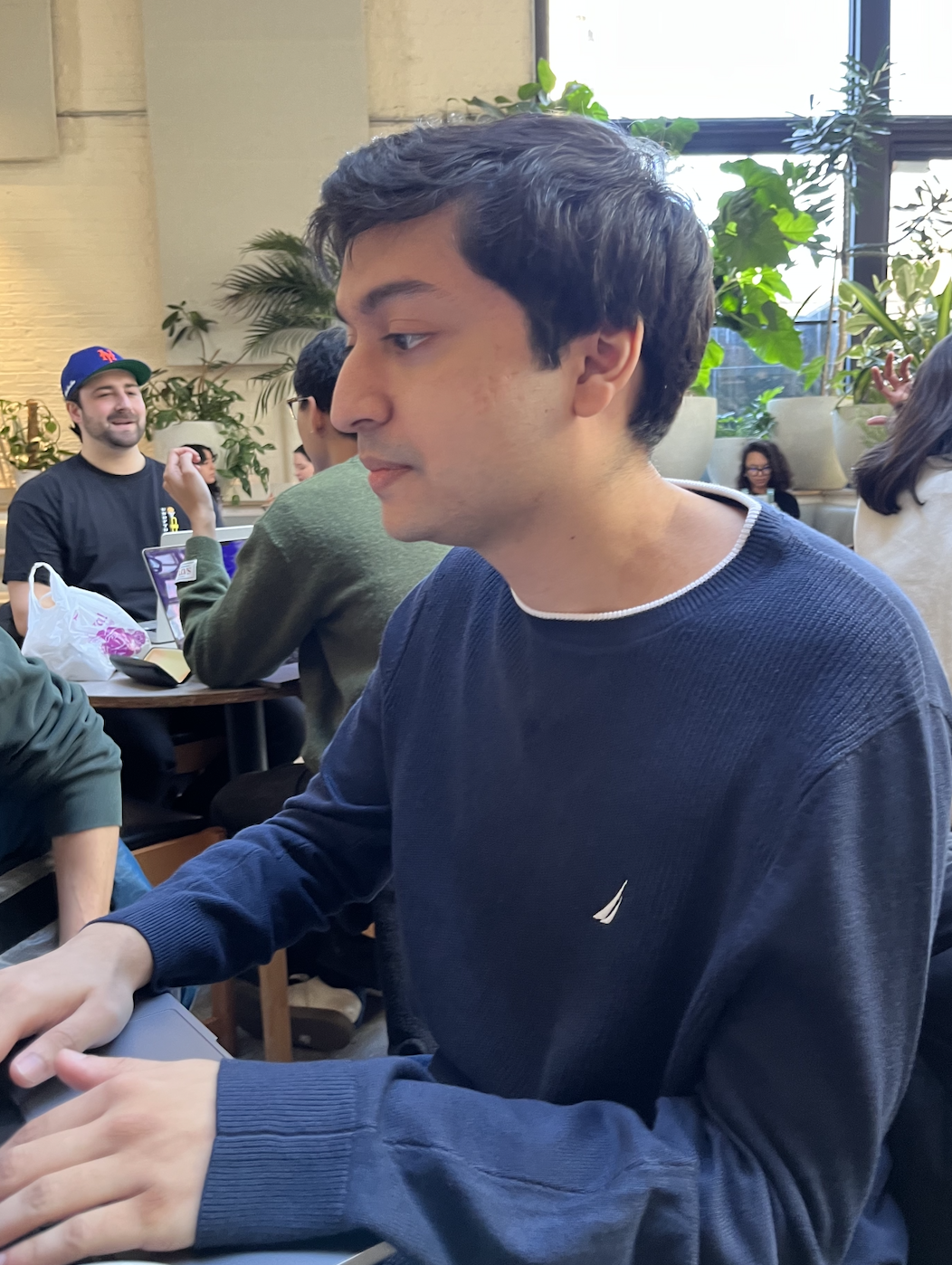
Agarwal working on Infinite Craft

Infinite Craft was made by Neal Agarwal, a software developer based in New York City. In an interview, Agarwal said that he has been developing games since the age of nine and that he thinks "There should be more people creating fun stuff on the web." After enrolling at Virginia Tech in 2016, he created neal.fun, a collection of small browser games about various topics, most of which he created during lectures. One of the site's first games, Spend Bill Gates' Money, received attention with over 80 million page views. The site was again popularized when Agarwal released The Password Game, a game in which the player needs to pick a password that abides by increasingly unusual and complicated rules, on June 27, 2023.

Development of Infinite Craft was announced on January 16, 2024. The game was made available on the website on January 31, two weeks after the announcement. Mobile apps were later developed and released on App Store and Google Play on April 30, 2024, and May 21, 2024, respectively.

The game became popular on the internet shortly upon release. According to Agarwal, the game received over thirty thousand views in the first month and over 300 million recipes are created each day. This has caused the website's servers to overload, and Agarwal had to petition the hosting service provider to increase its bandwidth.

== Reception ==
The game received positive reviews upon release. Christian Donlan of Eurogamer compared Infinite Craft to one of his lucid dreams, explaining that an element "always [runs] away" when the player tries to figure out what elements to combine, while journalist Kieran Press-Reynolds, writing for The New York Times stated it was "like peering into an A.I.'s brain", adding that the game's nonsensical nature "adds to the allure". Rock Paper Shotgun's Graham Smith praised how the game was "glorious, time-stealing fun to try", commenting how "the real joy comes" when a player finds a simple way to create an element.

== See also ==
- Doodle God
- Incremental game
- Internet Roadtrip
- Little Alchemy
- The Password Game
- Stimulation Clicker
