= Hyper Hippo Entertainment =

Canadian video game developer

Hyper Hippo Entertainment Ltd.
- Type: Private
- Industry: Video games
- Founded: 2012; 14 years ago
- Founders: Lance Priebe; Pascale Audette
- Headquarters: 1650 Bertram Street; Kelowna, British Columbia; V1Y 2G4
- Key people: Lance Priebe (CEO & CCO)
- Products: AdVenture Capitalist; AdVenture Communist; AdVenture Ages; Vacation Tycoon; Wild Warfare; Leviathans Online
- Number of employees: 108
- Website: hyperhippo.com

Hyper Hippo Entertainment Ltd. is a Canadian video game and software development company. It was co-founded by Club Penguin founder Lance Priebe and Pascale Audette, a former employee of Disney Online Studios Canada. Their current most popular games include AdVenture Capitalist and Wild Warfare, among many others.

== History ==
Hyper Hippo was founded by Lance Priebe and Pascale Audette in late 2012. Its original purpose was to expand the size of Priebe's old studio, RocketSnail Games, which is today used as a personal studio for independent projects by Priebe. Hyper Hippo formally inherited all of RocketSnail's projects, including Mech Mice and Leviathans Online.

In November 2012, Catalyst Game Labs announced a partnership with Hyper Hippo to create Leviathans Online. Later in December 2012, Wired's GeekDad also reported about Catalyst Games and Hyper Hippo Games possibly partnering.

In 2015, they published a revamped version of browser game AdVenture Capitalist for mobile.

In February 2016, Jagex announced a partnership with Hyper Hippo to create RuneScape: Idle Adventures, a spin-off of RuneScape described as a quick-to-play RPG that can be played "in just a few moments each day". On September 1, 2016, an early access beta was released through Steam on PC. The game was also planned to be released on mobile devices but was shut down and removed from Steam on May 15, 2017.
