= Make It Rain: The Love of Money =

2014 incremental video game

- App icon on iTunes
- Publishers: Space Inch, LLC
- Platforms: iOS, Android, Windows Phone
- Release: April 1, 2014
- Genre: Incremental game
- Mode: Single-player

Make It Rain: The Love of Money is a 2014 incremental mobile game published by American indie studio Space Inch LLC. In the first week after its launch on the Apple OS, it was with 2 million downloads the most downloaded game in the iTunes Store. Inside the game, virtual money can be earned with insider trading, subprime mortgages and the bribing of political figures. According to the creators, the game is a satire on the obsession with wealth. The game is available for Apple iOS, Android and Windows Phone operating systems. The idea for the game was originally inspired from a previously released game called Make Money Rain.

== Gameplay and themes ==
As an incremental game, there is no end goal in Make it Rain, but rather the endless goal of acquiring more currency, which ties into the game's themes of greed and corruption. This can be done through in-game means, or through in-app purchases. Space Inch's Chairman Josh Segall, who is a criminal lawyer, indicated that he found it disturbing that the option to bribe the FBI is the most popular paid purchase within the game.

== Development ==
According to Josh Segall, the company spent $10,000 on development and $1,000 on marketing of the game and returns a daily profit of $50,000 with advertisements and purchases within the game. Space Inch also published the games Inch Disco Bees and Say The Same Thing. Andy Ross, guitarist of the band OK Go is lead developer at Space Inch, LLC.
