= Little Alchemy =

- The logo of the first game
- Developer: Recloak
- Publisher: Recloak
- First release: Little Alchemy; December 8, 2010
- Latest release: Little Alchemy 2 August 23, 2017

Little Alchemy is a series of games developed and published by Recloak based on the premise of mixing and combining elements.

== Gameplay ==
The Little Alchemy games focus on the concept of merging elements together to make new elements. Players start with the four classical elements; earth, water, fire and air, with the goal of merging them to make as many elements as possible. In Little Alchemy, there is a total of 580 elements with 9 hidden elements. In Little Alchemy 2, there are 720 elements.

== History ==
Developed by Jakub Koziol, Little Alchemy was initially released on December 8, 2010, as a browser game. The game was released for Android and iOS in 2012. Its sequel, Little Alchemy 2, was released for web browsers, iOS, and Android on August 23, 2017, serving as a remake of its prequel.

Release timeline
2010	Little Alchemy
2011
2012
2013
2014
2015
2016
2017	Little Alchemy 2

== Reception ==
Reviewing Little Alchemy, Hayley Tsukayama of The Washington Post describes the game as a simple, relaxing crafting game, praising its satisfying experimentation while noting its lack of flashy graphics, complex stories, or action.

Reviewing Little Alchemy 2, KeenGamer's Gail Golembiewski gave the game an 8.5 and wrote that the game is "worth playing because it adds to your gaming experience and science knowledge". Game Rant notes its similarities to Infinite Craft.

== See also ==
- Doodle God
- Infinite Craft
