= Internet Roadtrip =

Social experiment by Neal Agarwal

- Creator: Neal Agarwal
- Website: neal.fun/internet-roadtrip/
- Launched: May 6, 2025
- Current status: Active

Internet Roadtrip is a social experiment where players collectively navigate a virtual car by voting on which direction to go in or to either honk or change the radio. The concept was developed by Neal Agarwal and launched on May 6, 2025, on his website, neal.fun.

== Overview ==
The interface of Internet Roadtrip, showing the Google Street View coverage, voting system, minimap, odometer, and radio.

Inspired by Twitch Plays Pokémon and r/place, the experiment features a virtual car navigating the world via Google Street View, where people participate by voting for the next direction to go in every 3 to 10 seconds, but can also instead vote to either honk the horn by interacting with the steering wheel, or seek to switch stations on the built-in radio, which are grabbed from internet streams around the current location. The vehicle travels at approximately 3 mph (4.8 km/h). Where the car is driven is actively tracked and marked with a red line on a mini-map present in the bottom left corner.

The experiment began on May 6, 2025, beginning in Boston, Massachusetts. With the introduction of the experiment's Discord server a while later, with one of its channels being relayed on the website, participants began communicating with others on where to go, with general consensus being to navigate into Canada through the border, a goal that would later be accomplished. Due to the limitations of Google Street View coverage, players are restricted to a section of North America, with most of Alaska and a few other regions out of range due to gaps in the coverage. Edwin Evans-Thirlwell of Rock Paper Shotgun commented on debates that occurred within the community, believing that the chat may "become a trash fire at some stage." The website is estimated to have an upwards of 15,000 daily active users, with the highest concurrent player count being around 2,500.

The experiment notably caught the attention of both student-run radio stations, WMUA in Amherst, Massachusetts, and WBOR in Brunswick, Maine, as participants passed through their respective coverage areas. One of the players called into WMUA to share the project with the DJs, with one of them commenting, "this is so cool." WBOR shouted out and partook in the experiment by allowing participants to curate songs. The radio manager, Mason Daugherty, reported the station's digital listenership had increased by 100 times, prompting tweaks to increase the servers' capacity. It has also gotten shoutouts from other radio stations, most notably the multiple given from CFEP-FM, based in Eastern Passage, Nova Scotia.

== See also ==
- Infinite Craft
- The Password Game
- Stimulation Clicker
