= Mech Mice =

- Developers: Hyper Hippo Games; Oktober Animation
- Publisher: Hyper Hippo Games
- Engine: Unity
- Platform: Online
- Release: 8 October 2013
- Genre: Strategy tactical role-playing game
- Mode: Single-player

Mech Mice is a 2013 strategy tactical role-playing game developed by Hyper Hippo Games and Oktober Animation. Players are able to control multiple mouse soldiers in a fictional military force known as the Mech Mice. This is a battle between the Dark Union and other predators to protect the fictional content of Roden. Mech Mice beta was released on 9 July 2013 and was officially made available on 8 October 2013. In an effort to expand the brand, the main game was renamed to Mech Mice Tactics on 1 March 2014. An animated series co-produced by Oktober Animation, Nelvana, and Playmates Toys was announced in 2015.

== Gameplay ==
Mech Mice Tactics is divided into multiple seasons, each including various chapters. As of May 2015, only one season is available with two playable chapters. The third chapter is currently being developed, though its release date is unknown.

Each chapter has a different storyline from the others, though they all add up to one large story that concludes in the final chapter for the season. The player controls different characters who each have their own special abilities. As a turn-based game, the protagonists and antagonists will take turns on attacks, each attack being one at a time. Each chapter typically ends with a final boss fight.

== Related media ==
=== Mech Mice Academy ===
Mech Mice Academy, shortened to Academy or MMA, was a multiplayer first-person shooter game, based on the academy used to train soldiers in Mech Mice Genesis Strike. Mech Mice Academy was first announced on 18 December 2013, with alpha testing releasing two days later. It received a very positive and enthusiastic reaction. Mech Mice Academy had two maps, both based in Blackwall Burrow.

As of May 2014, Mech Mice Academy has been decommissioned and replaced by Wild Warfare, a new first-person shooter by Hyper Hippo that is available both on their website and on Steam. The setting of Wild Warfare is separated from the Mech Mice setting.

=== Mech Mice: Genesis Strike ===
Mech Mice Genesis Strike is a fiction book written by Christopher and Allan Miller, as the "Miller Brothers", and published by Spearhead Books in February 2012. The book was announced on 23 March 2011, on the RocketSnail Games website. The chapters of the book were put online once every month, including illustrations.

== Reception ==
Common Sense Media reviewed the game, stating that it would be "ideal for younger gamers who want a little brains with their brawn."
