= Persuasive Games =

American video game company

Persuasive Games is a video game developer founded by Ian Bogost and Gerard LaFond in 2003. The company focuses on making advergames with strong opinions. Their first game, Howard Dean for Iowa is about trying to get Howard Dean to win the Iowa caucuses. They have also created the first computer game to be included as part of a newspaper's editorial, Food Import Folly for the New York Times. Other notable games are Disaffected!, a satire about a copy store, and Airport Security, a game about airport contraband.

== Games ==
- Killer Flu: Commissioned by the UK Clinical Virology Network and produced in association with Scotland's Traffic Games, this is a game about how the flu virus spreads.
- Debt Ski: A game that teaches one how to handle one's money. Commissioned by MTV's college network, mtvU, and the Peter G. Peterson Foundation.
- Oil God: Game published by Shockwave.
