= Clicker Heroes =

2015 video game

- Logo
- Developer: Playsaurus
- Publisher: Playsaurus
- Platforms: Web browser, Microsoft Windows, OS X, iOS, Android, PlayStation 4, Xbox One
- Release: Browser; 2014; Microsoft Windows, OS X; May 13, 2015; Mobile; August 20, 2015; PlayStation 4; March 7, 2017; Xbox One; March 10, 2017
- Genre: Idle
- Mode: Single-player

Clicker Heroes is an idle game that was developed by American independent studio Playsaurus. It was originally released for browsers in 2014, for mobile devices in 2015, and for Xbox One and PlayStation 4 consoles in 2017. The game is a spinoff of Playsaurus's earlier game Cloudstone, from which it uses many graphic elements.

Clicker Heroes is free-to-play, but players can use microtransactions to buy an in-game currency called "rubies". This currency is not required to progress through the game; it was added some time into the game's life and multiple gameplay mechanics center around obtaining the premium currency in-game.

Clicker Heroes received positive reception from critics; Nathan Grayson of Kotaku called it "[a] perfect office space distraction".

== Gameplay ==
Level 64, with the upgrade screen on the left and monster on the right

In Clicker Heroes, the player clicks on the monster to damage and eventually kill it. Once killed, the monster drops gold that can be used to upgrade and purchase characters. Purchased characters automatically damage the monster, increasing the player's total damage per second. The game runs without the player needing to do anything. The player must kill ten enemies in one level to advance to the next level. Starting at level five, every fifth level is a boss level, which only requires the killing of one monster to advance. Boss levels have a timer; the player must kill the boss within the allotted time. Between levels 100 and 1,000, every hundredth zone's boss is a "centurion" boss that drops Hero Souls when killed. Additionally, every boss after level 100 has a 25% chance of being "primal". Primal bosses give much greater amounts of Hero Souls in later stages of the game.

The goal of Clicker Heroes is to obtain Hero Souls, which can be used to buy Ancients that give the player benefits, the nature of which depends on which Ancient is purchased. After primal bosses are killed, the player must perform an Ascension, which resets their character upgrades and level progression, before they receive Hero Souls.

== Development and release ==
Clicker Heroes was released as a Flash game on the gaming website Kongregate in August 2014, and on Armor Games in September 2014. It was released onto the Steam platform in May 2015 for Microsoft Windows and OS X. On August 20, 2015, Clicker Heroes was released for iOS and Android. Version 1.0 was released in June 2016. In May 2019, the iOS version was generating an income of $200-$300 per day until an international trademark dispute caused Apple to remove the game from the app store. The browser game was relaunched in September 2022 on the gaming platform CrazyGames after a period of inaccessibility due to the discontinuation of Flash.

== Reception ==
Reception

Review scores
Publication	Score
Push Square	5/10
Gamezebo	80/100

Clicker Heroes received very positive reception from critics. Kotaku's Nathan Grayson said the game "[is a] perfect office space distraction". Eurogamer writer Christian Donlan said the game was his "gaming secret" and is very addictive. Forbes writer Paul Tassi said if the game gained traction in the mobile market, it could become the top mobile game of 2015. Sammy Barker of Push Square gave the game a 5/10 score, stating, "Too many brickwalls [sic] prevent Clicker Heroes from reaching the highs of AdVenture Capitalist, but this is still a frighteningly addictive incremental title".

Clicker Heroes' popularity on Steam initiated the release of other incremental games on that platform. Clicker Heroes has inspired the creation of other games such as The Longing. Clicker Heroes also won "Game of the Year" on Armor Games.

== Sequel ==
Playsaurus created a sequel called Clicker Heroes 2, which was available on Steam Early Access as of 2018. Unlike the original Clicker Heroes, Clicker Heroes 2 is not free to play. Gravity hired Playsaurus to develop a Ragnarok Online-themed version of Clicker Heroes that was titled Ragnarok Clicker, which was released on August 3, 2016.
