= The Password Game =

2023 video game

- Developer: Neal Agarwal
- Platform: Web
- Release: June 27, 2023
- Genre: Puzzle
- Mode: Single-player

The Password Game is a 2023 puzzle browser game developed by Neal Agarwal, on the online website neal.fun, where the player creates a password that follows increasingly unusual and complicated rules. Based on Agarwal's experience with password policies, the game was developed in two months, releasing on June 27, 2023. The game went viral and was recognized in the media for the gameplay's absurdity and commentary on the user experience of generating a password. It has been played over ten million times.

== Gameplay ==
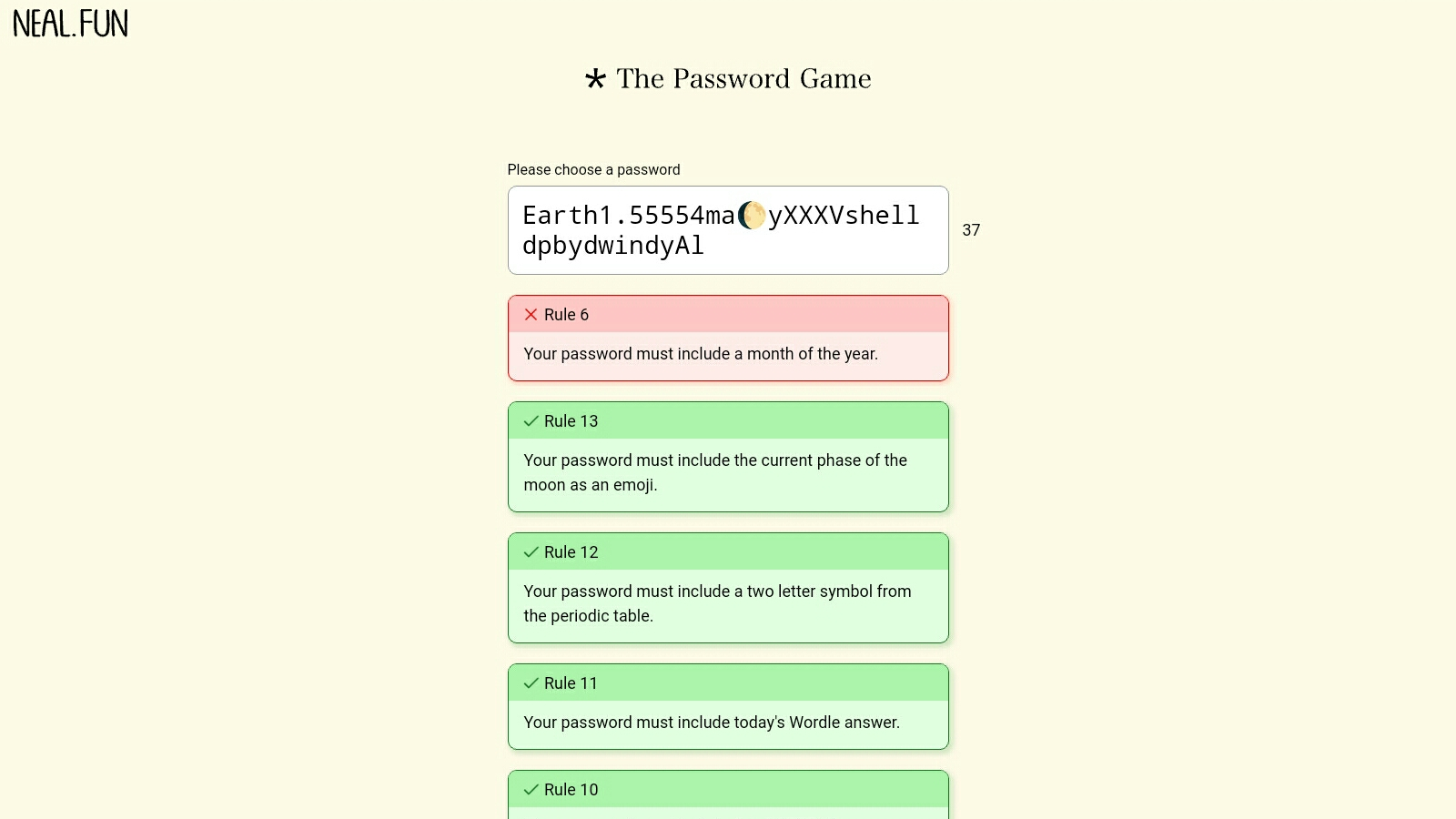
The player must follow strict rules that may conflict with one another, and at times requires players to play other games, such as GeoGuessr, Wordle, and chess. In this screenshot, the inclusion of the moon emoji satisfies Rule 13; however, it splits the word "may", breaking Rule 6.

The Password Game is a web-based puzzle video game. The player is tasked with typing a password in an input box. The game has a total of 35 rules that the password must follow and which appear in a specific order. As the player changes the password to comply with the first rule, a second one appears, and so on. For each additional rule, the player must follow all the previous ones to progress, which can cause conflict. When all 35 rules are fulfilled, the player is able to confirm it as the final password and then must retype the password to complete the game.

Although the initial requirements include setting a minimum of characters or including numbers, uppercase letters, or special characters, the rules gradually become more unusual and complex. These can involve managing having Roman numerals in the string to multiply, adding the name of a country that players have to guess from random Google Street View imagery (as a reference to GeoGuessr), inserting the day's Wordle answer, typing the best move in a generated chess position using algebraic notation, inserting the URL of a YouTube video of a randomly generated length, and adjusting boldface, italics, font types, and text sizes.

Other game rules involve emojis in the password. One demands inclusion of the emoji representing the moon phase at that point in time. Because of two other rules, the player is required to insert an egg emoji named Paul, and once it hatches, it is replaced by a chicken emoji. The player then must keep it fed using caterpillar emojis that must be replenished over time. If it starves, the player overfeeds it, or the Paul emoji is deleted in any way, the game ends and the player must restart from the first rule. Red text subsequently appears over a black background, referencing the death screen characteristic of the Dark Souls action role-playing game series. At some point during the game, a flame emoji will appear, spreading through the password by replacing characters, including the egg, with flames that must be removed.

== Development and release ==
The Password Game was developed by Neal Agarwal, who posts his games on his website, neal.fun. Agarwal had conceptualized the idea of the game as a parody of password policies as they got "weirder". According to Agarwal, "the final straw" that made him start to work on the game may have been when he was trying to create an account on a service and was told that his password was too long, mocking the notion of a password being "too secure". Development started in late April 2023 and took two months. Agarwal mentioned that implementing regular expressions ("find" operations in strings) was hard, especially due to features of the game's text editor that show up as the player progresses, like making text bold or italic. Some of the game's password requirements were suggested to him on Twitter. Before release, Agarwal was unsure whether winning the game was possible; he attempted it unsuccessfully multiple times. The game was released on his website on June 27, 2023.

== Reception ==
The Password Game went viral online soon after release. After its first day, the tweet announcing the game was retweeted over 11,000 times, and according to the developer, the game's website received over one million visits. The tweet received multiple comments discussing numbers that people reached in the game. As reported by Engadget, Twitter mentions of Agarwal were "full of people cursing him for creating" the game and people exclaiming having beaten it, to the surprise of the developer. As of October 2023, the game was visited over 10 million times.

Many critics have contrasted the standardness and simplicity of the game's initial password rules to the absurdity of the following ones. The sixteenth rule of the game, which is about finding the best chess move in a specific position, was considered the most challenging by PCGamesN and made other reviewers give up the game. While TechRadar and The Indian Express deemed The Password Game to be a good way to kill time, PC Gamer called it "the evilest will-breaking browser game to exist". The game was regarded by PCGamesN as possibly "one of the most inventive experiences of the year". Polygon described it as a "comedy set in a user interface" that incorporates many secrets behind its apparent simplicity. Rock Paper Shotgun discussed the gameplay loop of the game, finding they frequently experienced amusement, followed by effort to fulfill the rule, and feeling satisfied. PCWorld felt it emphasized the usefulness of password managers. TechRadar noted that while the game is a little outdated due to the widespread use of password managers, it still gives players pause for thought on the culture of password usage.

== See also ==
- Infinite Craft, another game by Neal Agarwal
- Incremental game
- Internet Roadtrip, another game made by Neal Agarwal
- Stimulation Clicker, another game made by Neal Agarwal
