= Racing the Beam =

2009 book by Ian Bogost and Nick Montfort

Racing the Beam: The Atari Video Computer System
- Author: Ian Bogost and Nick Montfort
- Publisher: MIT Press
- Publication date: March 31, 2009
- Pages: 184
- ISBN: 0-262-01257-X

Racing the Beam: The Atari Video Computer System is a book by Ian Bogost and Nick Montfort describing the history and technical challenges of programming for the Atari 2600 video game console.

== Content ==
The book's title comes from the fact that the Atari 2600, initially branded the VCS (Video Computer System), did not have a video frame buffer and required the programmers to write each line of video to the TV output, one line at a time. As there were only a limited number of machine cycles in which to do this, the programmers "raced" a high-speed electron beam across the screen. The resulting flexibility was an unexpected, but welcome, result of the VCS's low-cost design.

Racing the Beam discusses the history of the VCS platform and the design decisions that impacted the types of games that could be written for it. Specific games such as Combat, Pitfall! and Yars' Revenge are analyzed from a technical and cultural perspective.

Racing the Beam is the first in a series of books on early video-game platforms and has been cited by modern Atari 2600 enthusiasts as an inspiration for attempting to write new games for the platform.

== See also ==
- Raster interrupt
