= A Dark Room =

2013 video game

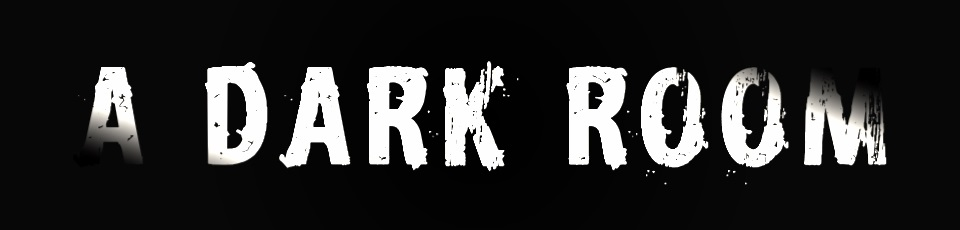
- Developers: Doublespeak Games, Amir Rajan (iOS)
- Publishers: Doublespeak Games, Circle Entertainment (Switch)
- Designer: Michael Townsend
- Platforms: Web browser; Android; iOS; Nintendo Switch
- Release: 2013
- Genres: Online text-based role-playing game Incremental game
- Mode: Single-player

A Dark Room is an open-source text-based role-playing game. It was originally published for web browsers by Canadian indie studio Doublespeak Games on June 10, 2013. Later that year, it was released in the App Store for iOS devices. In 2014, a prequel, The Ensign, was released for iOS and provided more insight into the world and its characters. An Android version was released in 2016. A Nintendo Switch version was released on April 12, 2019, and was temporarily removed from the Nintendo eShop shortly afterwards. The store listing has since been restored and the game is available for purchase.

== Gameplay ==
The game begins with the player awakening in a cold, dark room after a mysterious event. Initially, the player can only light and tend a fire in the room. As the game progresses, the player gains the abilities to collect resources, interact with strangers, start a village, and explore the world. As the game progresses, the type and quantity of resources and exploration available increases. According to The New Yorker, "What follows is a strange hybrid, part mystery story and part smartphone productivity software...the game evokes the simplest text-based computer games of the nineteen-seventies while stimulating a very modern impulse to constantly check and recheck one's phone. It's like a puzzle composed of deconstructed to-do lists." The site added, "You can begin to see a structure emerge from the fragments, but where that structure will lead you remains impossible to predict, and so the compulsion to keep pressing little word buttons grows stronger."

== Plot ==
The game begins with the player character lighting a fire in a dark room. Shortly afterward, a woman stumbles into the room and collapses. Struggling to sleep and beset by "voices", the player character starts to collect resources from a nearby forest to calm down. Eventually, the woman comes to her senses and reveals that she is a builder who can aid the player character. The builder helps the player character establish a village for wanderers to settle in. The villagers help gather resources, but the player character overworks them until they essentially become slaves. At some point, the player character's intense wanderlust causes them to acquire a compass and explore the area outside of the village. The player character emerges into a post-apocalyptic wasteland full of decrepit ruins and hostile enemies. If the player character dies while exploring, they awaken in the village, seemingly revived by the builder with the aid of a glowing locket around her neck. While exploring the wasteland, the player character discovers an abandoned "wanderer" spaceship and brings it back to the village. The builder, disgusted by the player character's mistreatment of the villagers and violent actions in the wasteland, eventually vanishes, leaving her locket behind. In the wasteland, the player character can encounter an old wanderer, who discusses his past as an admiral in a space fleet that devastated numerous planets. Ultimately, it is revealed to the player through numerous clues that "wanderers" are actually a race of extraterrestrial beings who invade planets and leave them in ruins. The player character, who is a wanderer, uses the spaceship to head into outer space in search of the builder. However, the ship encounters a meteor cluster and is heavily damaged, falling back to the planet’s surface and looping back to the beginning of the game.

In an alternate ending achieved by not building any huts, the locket is instead acquired when the builder collapses from exhaustion. The wasteland segment proceeds as normal, with the builder eventually waking and expressing optimism over the player character’s change of heart. The player character and the builder board the ship together. When the meteor cluster is encountered the builder uses telekinesis to push the danger aside, bleeding from her ears and nose and bidding the player farewell before falling unconscious. The player character successfully escapes the planet, though potentially at the cost of the builder’s life.

== Development ==
A Dark Room was created by Michael Townsend, the founder and lead developer of Doublespeak Games. It was released as a browser game on June 10, 2013. According to Townsend, the game was designed to tell its story entirely through environmental cues, rather than relying on exposition and dialogue. In July 2013, Townsend released the source code of the game on GitHub under the open-source license MPL 2.0. Soon, Townsend was contacted by developer Amir Rajan, who asked for permission to adapt the game for iOS. Amir ported the game to iOS using the RubyMotion mobile toolchain, and released it on the App Store in late 2013. An Android port of A Dark Room was released in 2016. A Nintendo Switch version of the game was released on April 12, 2019. On April 26, the game was removed from the Nintendo eShop because Rajan included a Ruby editor in the game as "a last second 'spark of inspiration.'" Rajan apologized for the incident, stating that he simply wanted to introduce people to coding. The Nintendo eShop listing has since been restored and the game is available for purchase. It was released in Japan on May 7, 2020.

On October 12, 2020, an open-source contributor Jonathon Orsi added audio capabilities to the browser game and created various lo-fi sound effects and ambient background music.

== Critical reception ==
Reception

Review score
Publication	Score
TouchArcade	4/5

TouchArcade gave the game a rating of 4 out of 5, writing, "It's a strange little thing, to be sure, but I'd definitely recommend A Dark Room to people who appreciate off-beat RPGs, fans of experience-driven games, or really anyone looking for something a little bit different from usual." Slide to Play rated it 3 out of 4, commenting, "It may not seem like much at first, but if you stick around long enough, it's easy to fall under A Dark Room's spell." 148Apps gave the game 3 out of 5, writing, "A Dark Room may have plenty of longevity and may be genuinely intriguing, but its interface feels undeveloped in its iOS iteration."

The New Yorker explained, "When A Dark Room was first released on iPhone, at the end of 2013, the game was listed in a number of Best of the Year lists, including those published by Forbes, Paste, and the gaming site, Giant Bomb." The app "rocketed to the most-downloaded spot in the App Store's games section in April and stayed there throughout the month".

Engadget praised the game's surprise ending, writing that "...it's definitely worth the time it takes to find it."
