= Neal Agarwal =

American-Indian programmer and game designer

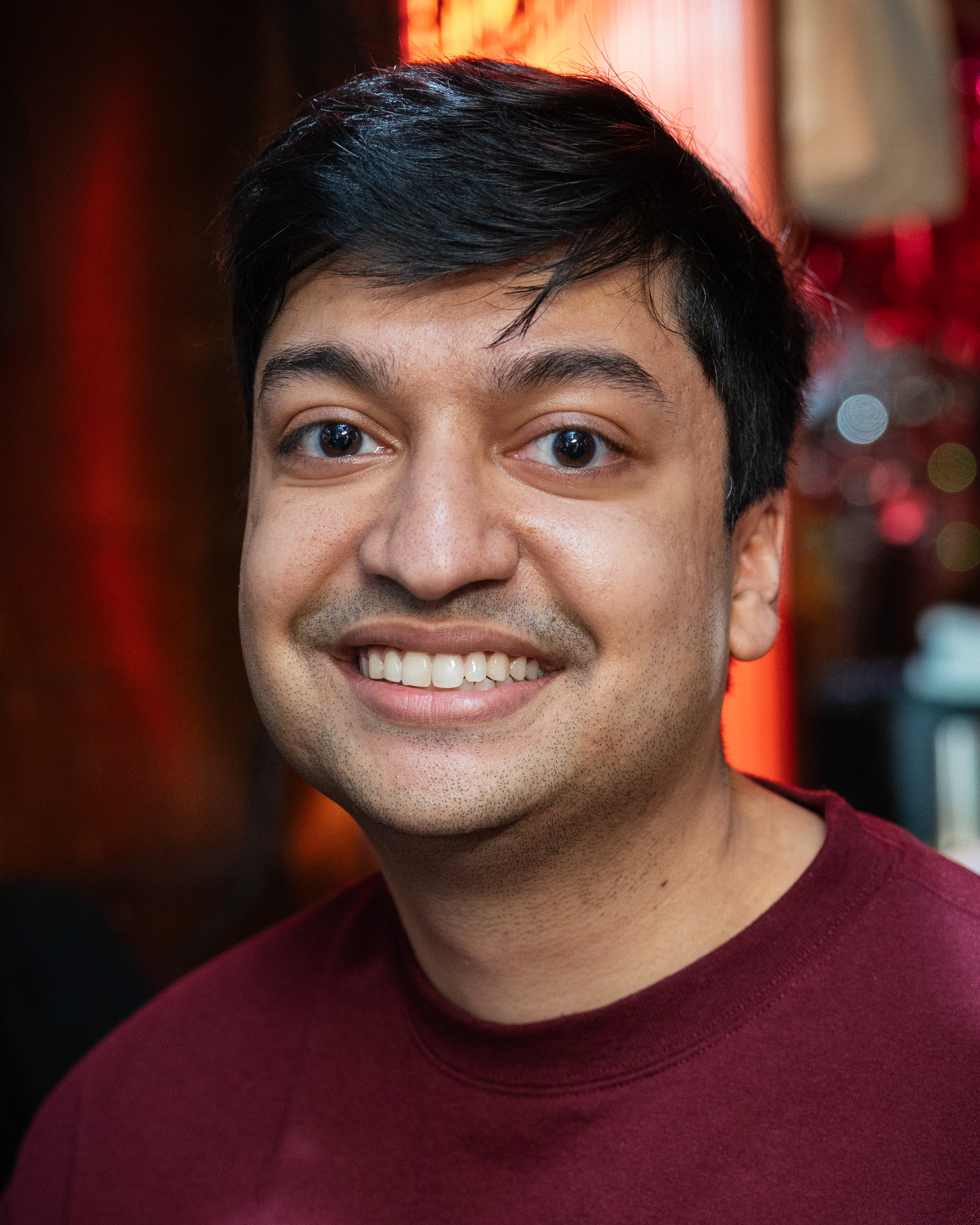
- Agarwal in 2023
- Born: January 26, 1998 (age 28)
- Education: Virginia Tech (BA)
- Occupations: Programmer, game designer
- Website: nealagarwal.me; neal.fun

Neal Agarwal (born 1998) is an American programmer and game designer. He is known for his website, neal.fun, which hosts various browser games such as Battle Draw, The Password Game, Draw a Perfect Circle, Infinite Craft and I'm Not a Robot. Many of his games have parodied internet conventions or served as educational games.

== Early life and education ==
Agarwal grew up in Fairfax, Virginia. He later attended Virginia Tech and graduated with a degree in computer science.

== Career ==
In 2006, at the age of nine, Agarwal created his first website, called Kidcrash, using a WYSIWYG editor, which compiled several of his favorite Adobe Flash games. He then began programming on Scratch and made a "knockoff" of Wipeout at the age of 12. Afterward, he learned HTML, CSS, and JavaScript.

In high school, Agarwal created a mobile game, called Toast Man. He then created web-based projects on the website Kamogo such as Silicon Valley Idea Generator and Text to Hodor.

=== neal.fun ===
In 2017, Agarwal launched his website, neal.fun, after which he began programming and listing his games on it. He worked on several of his first few games, like Spend Bill Gates' Money, as a student at Virginia Tech at the time. His creations had been inspired by his own upbringing with Adobe Flash games on the internet, or what he called the "Weird Web 1.0": "I would always go down these long rabbit holes. It felt like much more of an independent web."

By the time Agarwal graduated from Virginia Tech, he was able to make a full-time living from ad revenue on neal.fun, after which he continued to create more games and commit to neal.fun as a contribution to a possible "Weird Web 2.0." He additionally runs Just For Fun, a website that showcases other instances of "creative coding."

Briefly, Agarwal worked at MSCHF before deciding to focus on neal.fun fully.

Nowadays, neal.fun actively features games such as Internet Roadtrip, I'm Not a Robot, Sandboxels, and more.

== Works ==
A list of current and former works on Neal.fun
Game	Established	Discontinued
Baby Map	October 26, 2017	present
Spend Bill Gates' Money	October 26, 2017	present
Wiki Files	November 5, 2017	2017
Progress	November 20, 2017	present
Draw Logos From Memory	December 9, 2017	present
Paper	December 22, 2017	present
Win the Powerball	December 30, 2017	2018
Speed	January 15, 2018	present
Hurricane Map	January 24, 2018	2018
Life Checklist	February 3, 2018	present
Draw Your Island	March 4, 2018	April 2021
Conquer the World	June 1, 2018	June 2021
Where does the day go?	June 15, 2018	present
Dark Patterns	October 2018	present
Who Was Alive?	December 13, 2018	present
Grandpa's Art Show	June 2019	April 2020
Share This Page	September 2019	present
The Size of Space	October 27, 2019	present
The Deep Sea	December 2, 2019	present
Life Stats	January 22, 2020	present
Printing Money	February 14, 2020	present
The Auction Game	March 4, 2020	present
Universe Forecast	April 26, 2020	present
Macaroni Draw	June 18, 2020	August 2021
Sell! Sell! Sell!	January 2021	present
Ten Years Ago	February 16, 2021	January 2024
Ambient Chaos	September 16, 2021	present
Rocks	November 3, 2021	present
Let's Settle This	January 9, 2022	present
Earth Reviews	April 20, 2022	present
Absurd Trolley Problems	July 5, 2022	present
Design the Next iPhone	August 23, 2022	present
Days Since Incident	September 28, 2022	present
Asteroid Launcher	December 5, 2022	present
Draw a Perfect Circle (Note: Developed by Matt Round, currently hosted on neal.fun.)	January 6, 2023	present
Wonders of Street View	January 23, 2023	present
Space Elevator	April 19, 2023	present
The Password Game	June 27, 2023	present
Internet Artifacts	October 25, 2023	present
Infinite Craft	January 31, 2024	present
Eyechat	July 30, 2024	September 2024
Sun vs Moon	August 14, 2024	May 2025
Stimulation Clicker	January 6, 2025	present
Internet Roadtrip	May 6, 2025	present
I'm Not a Robot	September 16, 2025	present
Size of Life	December 10, 2025	present
Sandboxels (Note: Developed and created by R74n.com, moved to neal.fun as a partnership. Originally hosted on https://sandboxels.r74n.com)	February 9, 2026	present
Constellation Draw	March 10, 2026	present
Cursor Camp	April 29, 2026	present
Wiki Spy	June 18, 2026	present
Unusual Suspects	September 2, 2026	present
Spend Elon's Money (Note: Made as a partnership with and originally hosted on Wired.)	October 8, 2026	present
Battle Draw	November 9, 2026	present
