= Cow Clicker =

Incremental video game

- Developer: Ian Bogost
- Release: July 21, 2010
- Genre: Incremental
- Modes: Single-player, multiplayer

Cow Clicker was an incremental social network game on Facebook developed by video game researcher Ian Bogost. The game served as a deconstructive satire of social games. The goal of the game was to earn "clicks" by clicking on a sprite of a cow every six hours. The addition of friends' cows to the player's pasture allowed the user to also receive "clicks" whenever the player's cow is clicked. A premium currency known as "Mooney" allowed the user to purchase different cow designs and skip the six-hour interval between clicks.

In the wake of a controversial speech by Zynga's president at the Game Developers Choice Awards in 2010, Bogost developed Cow Clicker for a presentation at a New York University seminar on social gaming in July 2010. The game was created to demonstrate what Bogost felt were the most commonly abused mechanics of social games, such as the promotion of social interaction and monetization rather than the artistic aspects of the medium. As the game unexpectedly began to grow in popularity, Bogost also used Cow Clicker to parody other recent gaming trends, such as gamification, educational apps, and alternate reality games.

Some critics praised Cow Clicker for its dissection of the common mechanics of social network games and viewed it as a commentary on how social games affect people.

== Gameplay ==
The player is initially given a pasture with nine slots and a single plain cow, which the player may click once every six hours. Each time the cow is clicked, a point also known as a "click" is awarded; if the player adds friends' cows to their pasture, they also receive clicks added to their scores when the player clicks their own cow. As in other Facebook games, players are encouraged to post announcements to their news feed whenever they click their cow. A virtual currency known as "Mooney" can be bought with Facebook Credits; it can be used to purchase special "premium" cow designs, and the ability to skip the six-hour time limit that must be waited before the cow can be clicked again.

== History ==
=== Creation and development ===
At the 2010 Game Developers Conference, Zynga's game FarmVille was awarded the "Best New Social/Online Game" at its Game Developers Choice Awards. Ian Bogost (who was also in attendance) was critical of Zynga's success, as he felt that its business model was focused on convincing users to pay money to progress further in their "freemium" games rather than treating gaming as an artistic experience. He also believed Zynga's vice president Bill Mooney was trying to attack "artistic" gaming during his acceptance speech for the award when he personally invited independent game developers to join his company. After the conference, Bogost coined the term "cow clickers" to describe games such as FarmVille which only involve performing tasks at certain intervals, since in these games, "you click on a cow, and that’s all you do." Bogost compared the players of Zynga's games to the rats in B. F. Skinner's operant conditioning experiment, often receiving variable reinforcement rather than regular rewards. As one of the most vocal critics of Zynga's practices and business model, Bogost made further appearances at various events and panels to discuss his views on social gaming.

In July 2010, Bogost was scheduled to make an appearance at a New York University seminar, "Social Games On Trial", to discuss the controversial aspects of social network gaming. To clearly demonstrate what he felt were the most commonly abused mechanics of these games, Bogost quickly developed a Facebook game entitled Cow Clicker. The game was designed to be a satire of what Bogost personally believed were the only points of FarmVille: to encourage users to continue playing by inviting other users into the game, and to provide incentives for those who purchase virtual goods. The bulk of the code was written in three days.

=== Updates ===
Unexpectedly to Bogost, Cow Clicker became a viral phenomenon, amassing over 50,000 players by September 2010. In response to its sudden popularity, he committed to improving the game with new features. Updates to the game added awards for reaching certain milestones (such as the Golden Cowbell for 100,000 clicks), the ability to earn Mooney by clicking on other users' Cow Clicker news feed posts, and the chance to randomly gain or lose Mooney on every click. New cow designs were also introduced, such as an oil-coated cow to commemorate the BP oil spill, and the "Stargrazer Cow", which was only a mirror image of the original cow that cost around $20's worth of Mooney.

Although continually disturbed by its popularity, Bogost also used Cow Clicker to parody other recent gaming and social networking trends; such as the addition of an API to allow websites to have their own clickable cows (in a process he dubbed "Cowclickification"), the spin-off game Cow Clicker Blitz (co-developed with PopCap Games co-founder Jason Kapalka), "My First Cow Clicker" for iOS (a parody of simplistic education apps; designed to "train" children on cow clicking and add the resulting clicks to their parent's total), and a "Cow Clicktivism" campaign where users could click on an emaciated cow to donate to Oxfam America—with a goal of donating an actual cow to a third world country. The cow, known as the "Cowclicktivist Cow", could also be unlocked for the player's pasture with a $110 donation.

=== "Cowpocalypse" event and conclusion ===
In 2011, an alternate reality game known as the "Cow ClickARG" was held, where a series of clues from the "bovine gods" eventually revealed that a "Cowpocalypse" would occur on July 21, 2011 (exactly one year since the original release of the game). From then on, every click made by players would deduct thirty seconds from a countdown clock leading to the Cowpocalypse. However, players could extend the countdown clock by paying to supplicate with Facebook Credits: paying 10 credits would extend the countdown by a single hour, while 4,000 would extend the countdown by an entire month. After $700 worth of extensions, the countdown clock expired on the evening of September 7, 2011. At this point, the game remained playable, but all the cows were replaced by blank spaces and said to have been raptured. Bogost intended the Cowpocalypse event to signal the "end" of the game to players; when addressing a complaint by a fan who felt the game was no longer fun after the cow rapture, Bogost responded that "it wasn't very fun before."

=== Data collection ===
In 2018, Bogost wrote an article for The Atlantic discussing the collection of data by Facebook apps, with reference to Cow Clicker, following a scandal involving Cambridge Analytica's use of Facebook data. Bogost notes that Facebook apps appear to be part of the website itself, whereas they actually operate with almost no oversight. He claims that "without even trying", Cow Clicker stored its users' Facebook ID and any networks (such as workplaces) that the user was a part of, and that this information is still stored on his private server. Bogost notes that he could have used this data for malicious purposes, criticising Facebook's "move-fast-and-break-things attitude toward software development".

=== Shutdown ===
Cow Clicker is no longer available to play due to Facebook's removal of "classic" Web Games.

== Reception ==
Cow Clicker received critical attention soon after its release. One early commentator was Alexia Tsotsis of TechCrunch, who acknowledged the game's intent as a commentary on the impact of social network games. In an interview, Bogost foresaw the transformation of the internet into a "compulsive virtual dystopia" through Zynga's use of social gaming.

Nick Yee of the Palo Alto Research Center compared the players of games which do not provide "meaningful opportunities for achievement, social interaction, and challenge" to rats in a Skinner box. Accordingly, he compared Cow Clicker to being inside an "incredibly clear Skinner box"—acknowledging how little effort the game took in order to keep users playing the game. Jason Tanz of Wired considered Cow Clicker as an example of the growth in the trend of gamification—where developers introduce elements influenced by games into their services without providing the normal "experience" a game traditionally incorporates.

PopCap Games co-founder Jason Kapalka praised Cow Clicker for being the type of "ironic, satirical, self-referential" game that Facebook's game ecosystem was lacking, as he felt there were too many commercially driven games on the social network. Playdom's Scott Jon Siegel criticized the game for not going far enough in its satire, and putting too many highlights on the "absurd monetisation practices and meaningless clicking which social games are all too well known for."

The game Cookie Clicker was developed by Julien Thiennot in 2013. Bogost describes as it as Cow Clicker's "logical conclusion".
