= Ensign (surname) =

Ensign is a surname. Notable people with the surname include:

- Datus Ensign (1783–1853), Methodist minister and evangelist
- Harry Ensign (1883–1943), American cinematographer
- John Ensign (born 1958), American politician
- Margaret Ruth Ensign (1919–2017), American taxonomist
- Margee Ensign (born 1954), American academic administrator
- Michael Ensign (born 1944), American actor
- Tod Ensign (died 2014), American lawyer
- William L. Ensign (1928–2010), American architect
