= The Ensign (video game) =

2014 video game

- Developer: Amirali Rajan
- Publisher: Amirali Rajan
- Platforms: iOS, Android
- Release: August 17, 2014
- Genre: Text-based
- Mode: Single-player

The Ensign is a text-based mobile game created by US-based indie developer Amirali Rajan and released on August 17, 2014. It is a prequel to A Dark Room.

== Plot ==
The Ensign takes place on an unnamed planet. The player character is part of an alien species known as "the Wanderers", so named for their lust to conquer planet by planet. At the time of the game, the Wanderers are losing a war with humans despite possessing highly advanced technology. As The Ensign starts, the player character's ship has fallen, leaving both the player and their ship's admiral heavily injured. The wounded admiral stays behind while the player seeks out the fallen ship. Eventually discovering and repairing it, the player character takes off in the ship, but it collides with an asteroid and crashes, leading into the events of A Dark Room.

== Gameplay ==
The Ensign is a text based role-playing mobile game with permanent death characteristics. Navigating the game world is done in an interface resembling the original Rogue, in which all characters, terrain, and objects are represented by letters and symbols, as in the "Dusty Path" segment from A Dark Room. If the character dies, the game displays a "Time Paradox" message in place of "Game over". The game then restarts from the beginning.

== Critical reception ==
Reception

Review score
Publication	Score
TouchArcade	3/5

TouchArcade gave the game a rating of 3 out of 5 stars, writing, "If you're looking for something that takes the mechanics of the original game and builds on them, this prequel has very little to offer you. On the other hand, if you're extremely interested in its story and world to the point that you would gladly play it again to get a few more details filled in, or you want some kind of pretense to run through the RPG portion of the game again at a much higher difficulty level, spend your dollar without guilt or worry. It might not be the follow-up to A Dark Room you would like, but it's highly likely nothing could be."

Modojo gave it 4 out of 5, writing, "The Ensign is a fantastically weird and wonderful RPG that has plenty going for it, but only if you have the time and patience to peel away the several layers. You'll find that it's delightfully bizarre in many ways, especially if you were a previous fan of A Dark Room."

Download.com said, "The Ensign is engaging and addictive, as long as you don't get too frustrated by your almost certain early failures."

148Apps said, "The Ensign takes most of its cues from A Dark Room to create a wonderfully weird text adventure."

Game Mob gave it 8.5 out of 10, commenting, "The Ensign is truly a game of its own, carrying much of the same qualities of A Dark Room which allowed this simple text-based game to be enjoyable. Although the story doesn't feel as complete, the mechanics are there for a very good RPG experience."
