= AdVenture Capitalist =

2014 video game

- Developer: Hyper Hippo Productions
- Publishers: Hyper Hippo Productions; Kongregate (iOS)
- Engine: Unity
- Platforms: Android, browser, iOS, Microsoft Windows, OS X, Linux, PlayStation 4
- Release: Browser: WW: May 30, 2014; Android: WW: December 2014; iOS: WW: February 18, 2015; Microsoft Windows, OS X: WW: March 30, 2015; Linux: WW: July 24, 2015; PlayStation 4: NA: August 16, 2016
- Genre: Incremental
- Mode: Single-player

AdVenture Capitalist is a free-to-play incremental video game developed and published by Hyper Hippo Productions. It was first released for browsers and Android in 2014, for iOS (published by Kongregate), Microsoft Windows, OS X, and Linux in 2015, and for PlayStation 4 in 2016. AdVenture Capitalist allows players to live like a capitalist and invest funds into certain products to generate revenue, by starting out with a single lemonade stand. The more revenue generated, the higher the player's cash is. A player can receive an "angel investor" bonus when resetting their progress, which provides a boost in all products' revenue for the next progress timeline. New areas of business have been added since the game's release, allowing the purchase of investments on the Moon and Mars. A spin-off, AdVenture Communist, was released on Steam as early access on August 10, 2016, with the completed game being released on iOS and Android on November 16, 2017.

== Gameplay ==
There are three areas: Earth, Moon, and Mars. The player starts out on Earth with a single investment: a lemonade stand. Tapping it rewards money over time. When enough money is earned, more stands can be bought. Saving up allows the purchase of different investments at the cost of more time until payout. Once managers are hired for investments, they will run automatically, allowing successful idle play, even when offline. Upgrades can be bought to add multipliers to any investment.

When the player reaches 100 trillion dollars on Earth, they can start investing in a new world. The new world features different investments, costs, upgrades, and unlocks. The game also features premium currency, which includes gold and MegaBucks. Gold can be bought via in-app purchase with real money and can be used for purposes such as gaining angel investors without resetting, instantly earning money for a day's worth of idling, and more, but there are various ways to earn a small amount of gold for free. MegaBucks can be earned through limited-time events as described below, watching ads, and reaching certain milestones on Earth for the first time. MegaBucks can be bought on any world at a cost starting at 1 decillion of a world's currency, and that price is multiplied upon purchase by a fixed increment (the game describes this as inflation). When the player has 10 MegaBucks, they can purchase a golden ticket, which when used on a single investment boosts its profits permanently by ×7.77. After one has boosted all investments in a world, they will gain an additional ×10 boost, which increases the multiplier to ×17.77. This multiplier can be upgraded further using MegaBucks.

Since October 2015, players can also play a limited-time special event, usually themed around holidays and other annual events, such as Halloween or Black Friday. They run once per week for several days. These events function like the three worlds, each having their own set of businesses and upgrades, but are only available during that event. As the player progresses in events, they may acquire free gold or MegaBucks based on goal points. Even a special badge that provides investment-specific boosts when equipped can be obtained from certain event point milestones. The events recycle, so if a player has missed a previous event, they will have another opportunity to complete the tasks in the future.

Since The Love Of Money update, the 'Swag & Stats' section was renamed 'Career', along with the option for the player to make their character female.

== Reception ==
Reception

Review scores
Publication	Score
Pocket Gamer	3/10
148Apps	3.5/5
Push Square	6.3/10

AdVenture Capitalist received mixed reviews from critics. Pocket Gamer criticized the game for giving a little reward for progress, and stated that the achievements were dull. The review also found the in-app purchases to be too expensive, calling the game "a pointless waste of time" and "not much of an adventure." A review from 148Apps had similar opinions, calling the game "upbeat" but "a waste of time."

== AdVenture Communist ==
AdVenture Communist is a spin-off of AdVenture Capitalist, released on Steam on August 10, 2016. The goal of the game is to manage a mock communist state and become more powerful by buying different productions that produce resources. Specifically, there are five industries that all act as a different currency: Potato, Land, Ore, Military, and Placebo. These different currencies all have to be managed separately, with the exception that everything costs "comrades" (which replenish automatically) regardless of industry. As of December 2, 2018, the game has over five million installations on all platforms.

=== Reviews ===
AdVenture Communist has received generally positive reviews, but has been criticized for being too similar to its predecessor and excessive use of microtransactions. Edamame Reviews gave the game 8.8 out of 10, labeling it as "awesome". As of August 25, 2020, the reviews for the game on Steam indicate it as "mixed."

== AdVenture Ages ==
AdVenture Ages is a spin-off to AdVenture Capitalist and Adventure Communist. According to the developers, time gets broken and the player needs to fix it. It is an idle clicker like its predecessors combining elements of the previous two ages.
