= Kongregate =

American online gaming website

- Website type: Online gaming website
- Owners: GameStop (2010–2017); Modern Times Group (2017–2024); Monumental (2024–)
- Website: Kongregate.com
- Commercial: Yes
- Launched: October 10, 2006

Kongregate is an American web gaming portal and video game publisher. Its website features over 124,000 online games and 30+ mobile games available to the public. The company also publishes games for PC, mobile, and home consoles. It was purchased by GameStop in 2010 before being acquired by Modern Times Group (MTG) in 2017. Kongregate was sold to game developer Monumental in 2024.

The website's portfolio of games spans a wide range of genres. Kongregate is the home for several idle/clicker games, including Adventure Capitalist, Clicker Heroes, Crusaders of the Lost Idols, and Anti-Idle: The Game.

On the web portal, users could upload Adobe Flash, HTML5/JavaScript, Shockwave, Java, and Unity games with integrated high scores and achievement badges. The portal was closed to new user submissions in 2020, though previously submitted games remain.

== History ==
Kongregate was released on October 10, 2006, by siblings Emily and Jim Greer into an alpha testing phase, which lasted until December 2006. During that time, game developers and players tested the site's interface and functionality. The site formally entered the beta testing phase on March 22, 2007. In December of the same year, the site was formally opened to the public. By July 2008, Kongregate had raised around $9 million in capital from investments by Reid Hoffman, Jeff Clavier, Jeff Bezos, and Greylock Partners, a venture capital firm.

On July 23, 2010, GameStop announced an agreement to acquire Kongregate. In 2014, the site introduced digital creatures called Kongpanions, which act as a site-wide achievement system and metagame. The creatures often take the form of animals or anthropomophized objects. The Kongpanions which players collect can be used in some games on the site.

Kongregate was sold to game developer Monumental in 2024 in a deal that gave MTG a 30% stake in the resulting company.

=== Games publishing ===
In early 2013, Kongregate announced a $10 million fund devoted to mobile gaming and as part of this new program, Pany Haritatos, a former Zynga executive, was hired to oversee it. The money was used to financially support free-to-play mobile game developers by helping them test and market their games. Some of the developers who benefited from the fund included Synapse Games, RedPoint Labs, and Making Fun.

Kongregate announced plans in October 2016 to help developers bring their games to the Steam distribution platform with an updated software development kit to make it easy to port games between Kongregate's web and mobile platforms as well as the Steam platforms (Windows, macOS, and Linux). It also simplified for players data sharing between the platforms. That enabled games to take advantage of microtransactions through the Steam store for titles otherwise normally free-to-play. In 2016, Kongregate received Apple Editors' Choice for BattleHand and The Trail, and the company received Google Play Editors' Choice for Animation Throwdown and AdVenture Capitalist. BattleHand and The Trail were voted as Best of 2016 by Apple, and Animation Throwdown and The Trail were voted Best of 2016 by Google Play.

On June 20, 2017, Kongregate announced it had closed a deal to be acquired by Swedish entertainment company Modern Times Group for $55 million. That followed MTG's recent purchase of 51% of Hamburg-based online game developer InnoGames in 2016 and 2017. Planned as part of the deal was a change in focus from hosting third-party games to driving game development as well. "[...]we'll be deepening our investment in several areas, from marketing/marketing tech to platform engineering. We're also going to be investing in first-party development and potential acquisitions of our own within the games space," said CEO Emily Greer. On October 5, 2017, Kongregate acquired Chicago-based Synapse Games, the developer of Animation Throwdown.

On May 2, 2019, Kongregate announced that Greer, the co-founder and CEO was leaving the company. She was replaced by COO Pany Haritatos as an interim CEO. In December 2019, Kongregate acquired Surviv.io, a free-to-play online game. On July 1, 2020, Kongregate announced the discontinuation of submissions as it prepared for the end-of-life for Adobe Flash Player by December 31, 2020, during which time the software required to run most of its games would be disabled in some browsers. Other features of the site such as the forums were also halted at the time as the Kongregate team worked on transitioning their internal titles to HTML5.

=== Kartridge ===
In November 2018, Kongregate opened Kartridge, a digital storefront focusing on independent games. The storefront was available via browser or desktop app and features both premium paid games and free browser-based titles. Unlike other storefronts such as Steam, Kartridge was a heavily curated store. Kongregate hoped this curation would help spotlight quality games and address discoverability issues indie games commonly face. Another incentive offered to developers by the store was an increased revenue share for all games until they reached $10,000 in sales, with games that were exclusive to it having a higher threshold of $40,000.

Kartridge shut down in September 2023.

=== Kongregate.io ===
In July 2021, Kongregate announced plans for Kongregate.io, a web gaming portal featuring games that use non-fungible tokens.

=== Immutable X ===
In May 2022, Kongregate announced a team-up with blockchain game tech company Immutable X with a $40 million grant fund for developers who make blockchain games for Kongregate.

== Mobile apps ==
Kongregate has released 25 games for mobile devices that are available on the Google Play Store and the Apple App Store. Their most downloaded apps include AdVenture Capitalist, Pocket Politics, and Star Trek Trexels.

Kongregate mobile games released to the Google Play Store and Apple App Store
AdVenture Capitalist
AdVenture Communist
Realm Grinder
Pocket Politics
Pocket Politics 2
Where's My Water 2
Super Fancypants Adventure
Crossword Safari Word Hunt
Cosmo Quest
Hero's of Ring: Dragon War
Idle Payday: Fast Money
Office Space: Idle Profits
Lionheart Tactics
Endless Boss Fight
Tyrant: Unleashed
Dragon Idle Adventure
BattleHand
Spellstone
Little Alchemist
Royal Idle: Medieval Quest
Maleficent: Free Fall
Inside Out: Thought Bubbles
The Trail
The PowerPuff Girls: Monkey Mania
Idle Frontier: Tap Town Tycoon
Surviv.io (Sunset on March 2, 2023)
Zen Idle
Bit Heroes
Animation Throwdown: The Collectible Card Game
Burrito Bison: Launcha Libre
Run
ro
TMNT: Mutant Madness
