= Ensign Lake =

Lake in the state of Minnesota, United States

- Location within Minnesota
- Location: Lake County, Minnesota
- Coordinates: 48°2′3″N 91°22′18″W
- Type: lake

Ensign Lake is a lake in Lake County, in the U.S. state of Minnesota.

Ensign Lake was named for Josiah D. Ensign, a local judge.

== See also ==
- List of lakes in Minnesota
