= Doodle God =

2010 video game

- App icon
- Developer: JoyBits
- Platforms: Adobe Flash, Android, Bada, BlackBerry, iOS, J2ME, macOS, Windows, PlayStation Vita, PlayStation 3, PlayStation 4, Symbian, Windows Phone, Xbox One, Xbox Series X/S
- Release: June 11, 2010: iOS June 11, 2010; Adobe Flash June 23, 2010; Samsung BADA November 12, 2010; Windows Phone November 19, 2010; Android December 24, 2010; PlayStation Vita July 16, 2013; Windows September 24, 2015; PlayStation 4 July 5, 2016; PlayStation 3 July 13, 2016; Xbox One January 27, 2017
- Genre: Puzzle
- Mode: Single player

Doodle God is a puzzle video game developed by American game developer JoyBits and released for iOS and Adobe Flash. It released around the same time as another similar browser game Little Alchemy, both of which share gameplay with the 1997 MS-DOS game Alchemy.

== Gameplay ==
Acting as the Doodle God, the player must combine available elements together to gain access to new elements. Combinations can be both physical (such as combining Water and Lava to obtain Steam and Stone) and metaphorical (such as combining Water and Fire to obtain Alcohol). The game begins with only the four classical elements (fire, water, air and earth), and centers on the discovery of 249 elements across 26 categories. Should the player be stuck, a hint is available every few minutes.

== Reception ==
Reception

Review scores
Publication	Score
Gamezebo	4/5
Slide to Play	3/4
Pocket Gamer	2.5/5
AppSpy	4/5

Doodle God received the Weekly Users' Choice award on a web game portal Newgrounds. The game became a commercial success and has made it JoyBits' flagship series of games, having sequels and spin-offs such as Doodle Devil, Doodle Kingdom, Doodle Creatures, Doodle Tanks and Doodle Farm.
