= Progress Quest =

2002 video game

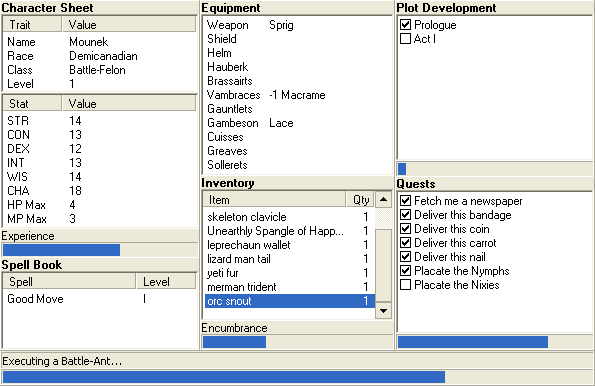
- The entire interface of Progress Quest
- Developer: Eric Fredricksen
- Publishers: Eric Fredricksen pkunk
- Designer: Eric Fredricksen
- Platforms: Windows, Linux
- Release: 2002
- Genre: Parody of MMORPGs
- Modes: Single-player, multiplayer

Progress Quest is a video game developed by Eric Fredricksen as a parody of EverQuest and other massively multiplayer online role-playing games. It is loosely considered a zero-player game, in the sense that once the player has set up their artificial character, there is no user interaction at all; the game "plays" itself, with the human player as spectator. The game's source code was released in 2011.

== Gameplay ==
On starting a new game, the player is presented with a few options, such as the choice of race and character class for their player character. Stats are rolled and unrolled to determine Strength, Constitution, Dexterity, Intelligence, Wisdom, and Charisma. Players start off with subpar equipment, eventually earning better weapons, armor, and spells. Almost none of the above-mentioned character statistics and equipment have any effect on gameplay, however. The only exception is the Strength stat, which affects carrying capacity, indirectly influencing the speed of level gain.

After character creation the game runs its course. The game displays the character's stats on the screen, including several progress bars representing how far the player character has advanced in the game. The lengthy, combat-free prologue is represented by a set of progress bars, each accompanied by a line of text describing, among other things, the "foreboding vision" the character has. Then the first act begins, and the character is "heading to the killing fields..." where they will start the endless cycle of "executing (number of monsters) (adjective of monsters) (monster type)" or "executing a passing (player character)", only disrupted when their strength is no longer sufficient to carry more items. This forces their return to the market, where they will sell all the loot (each group of monsters drops one monster-specific item of loot, player characters will drop random magic loot) and then spend all their accumulated money to buy equipment. With each group of monsters "executed" the quest progress bar will advance one step. Once it is filled, it will be reset and the player is awarded either with a magic item, a piece of equipment, or a stats upgrade including the learning or leveling of a spell. After a fixed amount of time, the player will enter a new act, which has no effect whatsoever.

All equipment in the game is randomly given out as a reward for several instances in the game such as completing a quest, killing certain enemies, leveling a character, and especially when at the market, in which the character uses gold from the loot to upgrade his or her equipment. These items usually consist of two adjectives and a noun. Like the games Progress Quest mocks, these items have statistics and the adjectives are variables describing the item. The character level is used to determine what stats and adjectives each item has.

Players may choose to create an account offline for their own enjoyment, or create an online multiplayer account that allows their character stats to be saved on a ranking website. This allows characters to compare their accomplishments with others while trying to achieve a higher ranking on their respective realm. Players can also join guilds of Good, Neutral, or Evil alignment in certain realms, though there is no benefit for doing so.

== Plot ==
The story tells of the history of Grumdrig and the creation of the realms. Currently, there are six realms: Knoram, Expodrine, Oobag, Spoltog, Pemptus, and Alpaquil. The latter three are still open, but Knoram, Expodrine, and Oobag were permanently closed to the creation of new characters upon the arrival of Pemptus, which launched on 8 February 2007. On 9 December 2021, users found a mysterious "Alpaquil" realm on the guild pages. Fredricksen then released a beta version of the new realm, which would be exclusive to the in-browser version of the game. At first, it was only accessible through a link provided by Fredrickson, but on 14 December the realm was fully released to the public. The story mimics convoluted fantasy plots, using archaic and made up words such as "aberdoxy".

== Development ==
Progress Quest parodies the stat-gathering aspect of role-playing video games, in which the player advances their character by accumulating arbitrary statistic points. EverQuest and many other MMORPGs of its time are infamous for their "auto-attack" combat system, where players press a button to initiate combat mode and, from then on, have little to do other than watch; Progress Quest mocks this with its totally non-interactive gameplay after the initial character setup. Progress Quest also pokes fun at traditional RPG races, classes, stories, quests, items, and more.

The program was made available by Eric Fredricksen in early 2002. Fans quickly joined in on the parody by submitting numerous reviews to several popular freeware download sites and game review sites giving Progress Quest the highest scores possible.

The game has been updated several times throughout its history. One particular upgrade added shaded bars to the screen, which caused some players to refer to the new version as Progress Quest 3D. On the game's now-deleted official forums, a popular in-joke leads newbies to believe that there exist Silver, Gold, Platinum or even Diamond-encrusted DVD versions of the game which have enhanced 3D graphics. Fake "Progress Quest" screenshots from other games, obscure 3D RPGs, helped spread this rumour.

In May 2011, Eric Fredricksen released the source code of the game on Bitbucket.

== Reception ==
Critics have commented that, despite the automatic progress, Progress Quest was an enjoyable experience. Reviewer Nick Hide compared this with other MMORPGs in which players persevere through dull tasks, just to level up or obtain a new item, owing to an emotional attachment with the character.

Progress Quest arguably represents the first example of a genre of casual game called the "idle RPG" or "incremental game", popular on certain web sites. These games generally feature a complex progress system in which progress is made automatically with the passage of time, but unlike Progress Quest, there are often decisions to be made by the player in terms of allocating resources between stats that do affect the game in order that the idled time should be used as efficiently as possible.

Bethesda Game Studios executive producer Todd Howard stated that Progress Quest influenced the Fallout mobile spin-off Fallout Shelter.

== See also ==
- Game artificial intelligence
- List of games with concealed rules
