= Cookie Clicker =

2013 incremental game published by DashNet

- Steam storefront header since 2023
- Publishers: DashNet; Playsaurus (Steam and console release)
- Designer: Julien Thiennot
- Programmer: Julien Thiennot
- Composer: C418
- Platforms: Android; Microsoft Windows; macOS; Web browser; PlayStation 4; PlayStation 5; Xbox One; Xbox Series X/S; Nintendo Switch; Nintendo Switch 2
- Release: WW: August 8, 2013; Android: WW: October 5, 2020; Steam: WW: September 1, 2021; PlayStation 4, PlayStation 5, Xbox One, Xbox Series X/S, Nintendo Switch: WW: May 22, 2025
- Genre: Incremental
- Mode: Single-player

Cookie Clicker is a 2013 video game created by French programmer Julien "Orteil" Thiennot. It is an incremental game in which the user initially clicks a big cookie on the screen, earning 1 cookie per click. (Note: Without any upgrades and effects, a click results in the addition of 1 cookie. With upgrades and/or effects, the amount is variable.) Players can use earned cookies to purchase "buildings" that automatically produce cookies, alongside upgrades which improve the efficiency of clicks and buildings. There are other mechanics allowing the user to earn cookies in various ways. As cookies are earned at an exponential rate, the game gradually shifts to themes of cosmic horror. Similar to other incremental games, the game lacks a conventional ending, instead allowing players to restart the game through "ascension" and earn a faster rate of growth.

The game has a dedicated fanbase. Though the original version was coded in one night, Cookie Clicker has been periodically updated since release. It has been widely described as addictive, and has been credited with playing a role in the emergence of idle gaming.

== Gameplay ==
=== Beginning ===
Gameplay screenshot

At first, the player clicks on a large cookie, (Note: Technically, the game can be played without clicking the big cookie by waiting for golden cookies or reindeer to appear.) earning one cookie per click. With these cookies, the player can buy additional means of production such as cursors, grandmas, farms, mines, factories, banks, temples, and 12 more that automatically generate cookies. Prices increase exponentially, with each asset costing 15% more than the last-purchased asset of the same type. The player may also purchase upgrades to increase cookie production for these buildings. Golden cookies, small cookies that appear in random locations and fade away after several seconds, appear periodically and grant effects, such as a temporary increase in the rate of production, if clicked before they disappear.

=== Custom mechanics ===
After earning a certain number of cookies, the player can 'ascend', losing all their progress but earning heavenly chips and prestige levels. Prestige levels add a permanent boost (+1% per level) to the rate of cookie production in future playthroughs, while heavenly chips can be spent on a wide variety of prestige upgrades. However, the number of cookies needed to unlock the next prestige level goes up proportionally with the cube of the level, becoming harder to attain as more are acquired. Other game mechanics include "wrinklers" (eldritch beasts which reduce cookie production, but can be popped by clicking them, returning all the cookies it digested with interest), Krumblor the Cookie Dragon, and sugar lumps (which take 24 hours to coalesce and are used to level up buildings, boost their production rate, and unlock minigames.) (Note: Sugar lumps are unlocked once the player bakes 1 billion cookies. Spending a sugar lump on Farms, Banks, Temples, and Wizard towers each unlocks a minigame.)

Achievements can be earned by completing various tasks or goals, such as reaching a certain number of total cookies produced, owning a particular number of buildings of a certain type or clicking a certain number of golden cookies. Upon reaching a certain number of achievements, the player unlocks different colors of milk that appear below the cookie. There are also shadow achievements, which are achievements that were determined too unfair or difficult to complete. Shadow achievements do not contribute to unlocking new milk. "Kitten" upgrades appear when a new milk is unlocked. With "kitten" upgrades, the player earns extra production depending on their total achievements. Additionally, seasonal events occur during their respective holidays which come with more upgrades and cookies to unlock.

The game features geometric or exponential growth: the player begins by baking individual cookies, but can quickly reach billions of cookies, and eventually attain trevigintillions (10^{72}) of cookies or beyond. Though the game has no clear ending, it has 637 achievements, and users may aim to reach milestone numbers of cookies. Players have speedrun Cookie Clicker, with speedrunning tournaments such as RTA in Japan Winter 2022 hosting Cookie Clicker events.

=== Buildings ===
Cookie Clicker has twenty tiers of structures, referred to as buildings. These generate cookies at a per-second rate (CpS) and progressivally ramp up your production. In the later game, the game's economic skills scale exponetially in cost and complexity, ranging from a cursor at 15 cookies and a grandma at 100 cookies to later buildings such as a portal and time machine. To deal with the costs of assets, acquiring specific quantities of a building unlocks upgrades which allow production efficiency to multiply. Orteil later introduced a secondary currency which allows users to upgrade the CpS of their buildings, also unlocking specific minigames such as stock market or a spell cast system.

== Development ==
Julien Thiennot, also known as Orteil, created Cookie Clicker on August 8, 2013. Written in a single evening, the game was posted in a link on 4chan, and garnered 50,000 players within hours. A month after the game's initial release, it had over 200,000 players per day. Orteil later wrote that traffic had peaked at 1.5 million hits in one day during August 2013, and by January 2014, Cookie Clicker was getting 225,000 hits per day. The game has had continual updates since its release, notably the "legacy" update in February 2016 and the "spiritual" update in July 2017. On October 25, 2018, Orteil launched the game's Patreon page, with the intent to develop Cookie Clicker and other Dashnet games becoming a full-time job, though it has been announced that the Patreon will close on January 24, 2026. As of January 27, 2026, the Patreon is no longer accessible. On August 8, 2019, the mobile beta for Cookie Clicker was released for Android devices after a long delay.

Cookie Clicker is similar to Cow Clicker, a previously existing idle game created by Ian Bogost. Bogost has called Cookie Clicker "the logical conclusion of Cow Clicker". Orteil later released other idle games such as: Idle Game Maker, a tool allowing customized idle games to be made without coding knowledge; AdventureQuest Dragons, a mobile game created with Artix Entertainment; and NeverEnding Legacy.

== Release ==
On August 8, 2021, Orteil announced on Twitter a Steam release of Cookie Clicker, with the planned release date of September 1, 2021. The game was released on Steam on its originally announced release date by publisher Playsaurus. The release included a soundtrack composed by C418. It reached over 60,000 concurrent players shortly after release, within the top 15 of Steam games at the time.

On May 15, 2025, Playsaurus announced that the game would be ported to PlayStation 4, PlayStation 5, Xbox One, Xbox Series X/S, and Nintendo Switch on May 22, 2025. It will release on Nintendo Switch 2 at a later date.

== Analysis ==
=== Impact on idle gaming ===
In an IGN article, Cookie Clicker is credited as one of the few games to have played a major role in the establishment of the genre of idle gaming (also known as incremental gaming). An article in The Kernel describes it as "probably the best-known" game in the genre.

In an issue of Digital Culture & Society, Paolo Ruffino notes the game is "supposed to be a parody of FarmVille" (a popular game which Ruffino says could be played easily with an algorithm, as the optimal action is always obvious), but that it is "equally addictive". Thus, the game "explores the absence of human agency". Ian Bogost, creator of Cow Clicker, similarly notes that "Cookie Clicker isn't a game for a human, but one for a computer to play while a human watches (or doesn't)." Cookie Clicker has been said by reviewers to be addictive, and its fanbase of 4 million daily active users have been described as "obsessive" and "almost cultish". Roisin Kiberd notes that fans of the game have pointed out that playing the game is bad for the environment (due to the computers being left on around the clock) and caused reduced efficiency at work.

However, due to their mockingly simple mechanics, idle games are also considered by many of being relatively simple or, as stated in an IGN article, "super dumb". Games such as Cookie Clicker have used this blend of simplicity and complexity to create a new genre that some may not consider as actual games. Orteil himself described his works as "non-games".

=== Themes ===
The game includes dark humour in the names and descriptions of some of its upgrades, achievements and mechanics, and generally contains themes of dystopia, cosmic horror, and apocalypse. Examples include an achievement titled "Global Warming" (upon owning 100 factories), a news ticker tape reading "New cookie-based religion sweeps the nation." and the "Grandmapocalypse", in which "the screen turns molten red and the central cookie is attacked by 'wrinklers'", and the world at large is implied to have been taken over by a hive mind of mutated grandmothers.

=== Grandmapocalypse ===
The grandmas are an important part of the Cookie Clicker lore. As research progresses in the Research Lab, the grandmas become increasingly agitated. The Grandmapocalypse is triggered once the player buys the "One mind" research upgrade. It is represented by the grandmas' appearance becoming awoken. Once reaching the second and third stages of the Grandmapocalypse, their appearance shifts to displeased and angered respectively. Golden Cookies are gradually replaced by Wrath Cookies as the Grandmapocalypse progresses. Wrinklers appear at increasing frequency based on the stage of the Grandmapocalypse. Halting the Grandmapocalypse is possible by purchasing the Elder Pledge, Elder Covenant or selling off Grandmas to 6.

GameRevolution commented that the game contains "supernatural dark turns that call into question the user's morality", citing how a player can choose to enslave grandmas to manufacture cookies. In The Kernel, Kiberd claims the game is "a parable about how capitalism will destroy itself". Kiberd suggests that Cookie Clicker is "saddling [the concept of fun] with ideas about success, achievement, and productivity", and "uses its own form as a critique of the larger structures of expectation and reward".

== Reception ==
Justin Davis of IGN called Cookie Clicker the "greatest Idle Game", commenting on how it balances power such that "every step of the way you feel like you're flying". He remarked on how the game creates anticipation for each major progression milestone. Destructoid described how its focus on gaining cookies creates an "illusion of progress, without any substantial advancement".

An academic work published by University of Minnesota Press analyzed Cookie Clicker as subverting the standard of digital media hiding its complexity. Rather, it forces players to confront how ever-growing systems minimise the importance of player decisions, mirroring detachment users face with complex modern technology.

Multiple sources have commented on the addictive nature of Cookie Clicker, alongside players' extensive playtimes. Sebastian Deterding, a professor of design engineering at Imperial College London, acknowledges the game's existence as a parody of Farmville and EverQuest, but comments on how it transcends this, engaging in gamification of progress, allowing players to "keep at a single 'silly' pursuit for hundreds of hours". He wrote that its players play "out of enlightened existential spite", perhaps including the author who acknowledges baking octillions of cookies over thousands of hours of gameplay, "orders of magnitude more time...than any other video game in my life." Boing Boing reviewed Cookie Clicker as a "highly-addictive browser game" while Polygon described it as "intriguing" and its fan base as "obsessive".
