= Ian Bogost =

American philosopher

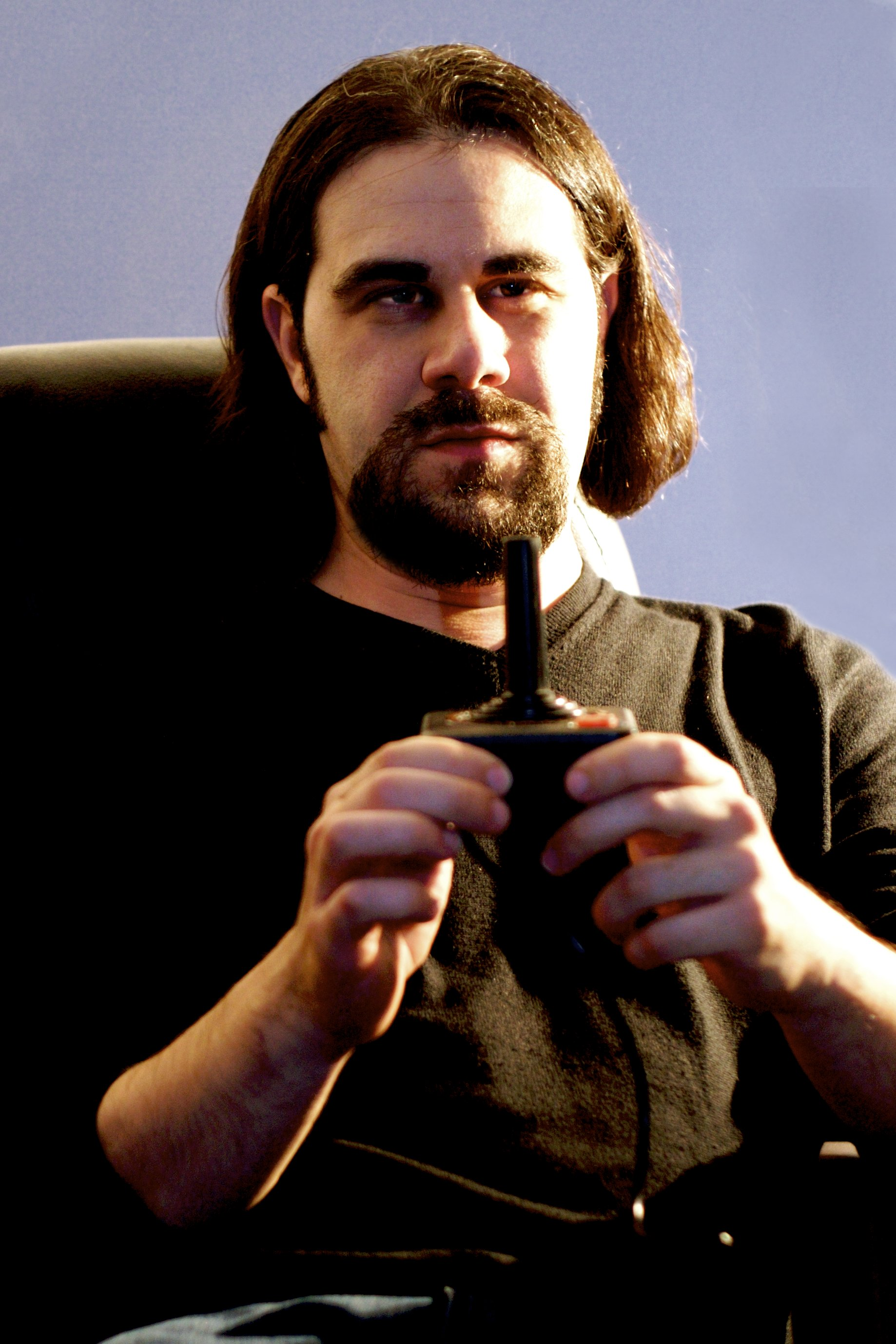
- Bogost with an Atari VCS joystick
- Education: University of Southern California (BA); University of California, Los Angeles (MA, PhD)
- Occupations: Academic, video game designer
- Employer: Washington University in St. Louis
- Known for: Cow Clicker, co-founder of Persuasive Games
- Website: bogost.com

Ian Bogost is an American academic and video game designer, most known for the game Cow Clicker. He holds a joint professorship at Washington University as director and professor of the Film and Media Studies program in Arts & Sciences and the McKelvey School of Engineering. He previously held a joint professorship in the School of Literature, Media, and Communication and in Interactive Computing in the College of Computing at the Georgia Institute of Technology, where he was the Ivan Allen College of Liberal Arts Distinguished Chair in Media Studies.

He is the author of Alien Phenomenology or What It's Like to be a Thing and Unit Operations: An Approach to Videogame Criticism and Persuasive Games: The Expressive Power of Videogames and the co-author of Racing the Beam: The Atari Video Computer System and Newsgames: Journalism at Play. His Atari 2600 game, A Slow Year, won two awards, Vanguard and Virtuoso, at IndieCade 2010. Bogost has released several other games, including Cow Clicker, a satire and critique of the influx of social network games. He is a frequent contributor to The Atlantic.

== Education ==
Bogost received his bachelor's degree in Philosophy and Comparative Literature from the University of Southern California in 1998. He then got his master's degree in Comparative Literature from the University of California, Los Angeles (UCLA) in 2001, and received his doctorate in Comparative Literature from UCLA in 2004.

== Professional career ==
In 2008, Bogost became an associate professor in the School of Literature, Communication, and Culture at Georgia Tech. In 2010, he was appointed Director of the Graduate Program in Digital Media, a position he held until 2012. In 2011, Bogost became a professor of Digital Media and an adjunct professor of Interactive Computing. In 2012, he was named the Ivan Allen College Distinguished Chair in Media Studies and a professor of Interactive Computing.

With Christopher Schaberg, he is co-editor of the series Object Lessons from Bloomsbury Publishing. His book Alien Phenomenology or What It's Like to be a Thing (University of Minnesota Press, 2012) critiques aspects of Bruno Latour's actor-network theory.

In 2021, Bogost quit his job at Georgia Tech partly because of the university's lack of COVID-19 protection requirements. He took a joint professorship at Washington University where he serves as director and professor of the Film and Media Studies program in Arts & Sciences and the McKelvey School of Engineering.

Bogost is a co-founder and chief designer of the game studio Persuasive Games.

== Honors and awards ==
- Winner, Vanguard & Virtuoso Awards, Indiecade Festival 2010 (for A Slow Year).
- Finalist, Indiecade Festival 2010 (for A Slow Year).

== Games ==
Game	Release	Notes	Ref.
Simony	2012	Released as both an iOS game and an installation at the Museum of Contemporary Art Jacksonville	
A Slow Year: Game Poems	2010		
Cow Clicker	2010		
Guru Meditation	2009	Also released for Atari 2600 as a limited edition	
Fatworld	2007		
Cruel 2 B Kind	2006	Concept and design with Jane McGonigal	
Jetset: A Game for Airports	2006		
Sweaty Palms	2004		
Horde of Directors	2004	Concept and design with Michael Keesey	
The Howard Dean for Iowa Game	2003	Concept and design with Gonzalo Frasca	

== Publications ==
- The Small Stuff: How to Lead a More Gratifying Life. Atria Books. 2026. ISBN 9781668062630.
- Play Anything: The Pleasure of Limits, the Uses of Boredom, and the Secret of Games. Basic Books. 2016. ISBN 9780465051724.
- "The Squalid Grace of Flappy Bird" in Goldberg, Daniel; Larsson, Linus, eds. (2015). The State of Play: Creators and Critics on Video Game Culture. Seven Stories Press. ISBN 978-1609806392.
- How to Talk about Videogames. University Of Minnesota Press. 2015. ISBN 978-0816699117.
- Alien Phenomenology, or What It's Like to Be a Thing. University Of Minnesota Press. 2012. ISBN 978-0816678976.
- How to Do Things with Videogames. University Of Minnesota Press. 2011. ISBN 978-0816676460.
- A Slow Year: Game Poems. Open Texture. 2010. ISBN 978-1933900162.
- Newsgames: Journalism at Play. MIT Press. 2010. ISBN 978-0262014878.
- Racing the Beam: The Atari Video Computer System. With Nick Montfort. MIT Press. 2009. ISBN 978-0-262-01257-7.
- Persuasive Games: The Expressive Power of Videogames. MIT Press. 2007. ISBN 978-0262026147.
- Unit Operations: An Approach to Videogame Criticism. MIT Press. 2006. ISBN 026202599X.
