= Incremental game =

Video game genre

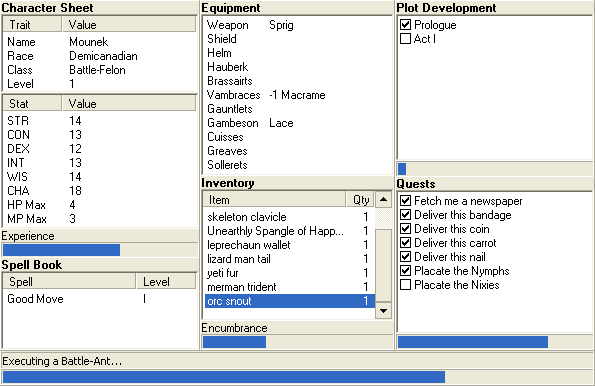
Progress Quest (2002), considered the first idle/incremental game

Incremental games are a video game genre characterized by the incremental accumulation of in-game resources, and gradual, often exponential progression through repetitive actions or automation. Incremental games that emphasize active input, such as repeatedly clicking a button to generate resources, are also called clicker games, while games that center on automation and progress that continues with minimal player interaction are also called idle games. Many incremental games combine both elements.

Incremental games frequently feature rapidly escalating costs and rewards, with numerical values often expressed in scientific notation, shorthand formats (e.g., "1T" for trillion), or even special naming schemes for extremely large numbers. Common mechanics include prestige systems, where players voluntarily reset progress in exchange for permanent bonuses, and monetization strategies involving microtransactions (such as instant currency boosts) or advertisements granting minor in-game rewards. Popular titles like Cookie Clicker and AdVenture Capitalist helped define and popularize the genre, combining open-ended gameplay with occasional closed endings, as exemplified by Candy Box!.

Originating in the early 2000s with satirical titles like Progress Quest and Cow Clicker, the genre evolved to incorporate idle mechanics such as offline progression and layered prestige systems. Critics note its appeal as a low-pressure, distraction-friendly experience, often likened to "glorified spreadsheets" with thematic depth. Despite debates over their status as "non-games," incremental games have influenced mainstream genres by introducing auto-play modes and progression loops. Auto clicker software can be used to automate manual tasks, reflecting the genre's emphasis on efficiency.

== Mechanics ==
=== Progress with limited or no interaction ===
In incremental games, players typically start off by performing simple actions – usually clicking a button or object – to earn a form of in-game currency. This currency can be spent on upgrades, items or abilities that enhance income generation, often automating the process and reducing the need for direct interaction. A common theme involves acquiring income-generating entities, which are frequently represented as buildings like factories or farms. These assets increase the rate of currency production, but higher tier entities usually have an exponentially higher cost. As a result, progressing between tiers tends to require a similar or increasing amount of time.

This mechanism offers a low-pressure experience, characterized by the absence of failure states, steady progression, and frequent feedback. Those features make incremental games particularly well-suited for social or mobile play patterns, and often result in a very high player retention.

=== Rapid growth ===
Incremental games typically feature rapidly escalating costs and rewards, fostering a steady sense of progression intended to sustain player engagement. They often enable the accumulation of a vast amount of in-game currency, with values commonly represented using scientific notation (e.g., 1×10^{34}), shorthand suffixes (1M for million, 1T for trillion, etc.), or special naming schemes for extremely large numbers (e.g., "duoquadragintillion"). In some cases, the magnitude of these values necessitates specialized data types or numerical libraries for accurate storage and display.

The resulting gameplay loop often consists of periodically returning to the game to allocate accumulated currency toward upgrades, automation features, or progression milestones. This loop shares similarities with the "energy currency" mechanic in social games, in which a player regains energy over time while inactive. However, in incremental games, this behavior emerges organically from the design of progression systems, whereas in social games it serves as an artificial limitation on playtime.

This structure may be more appealing to core gamers who view social games critically. It reflects familiar real-world patterns (e.g., "I'm out of cash; I need to come back when I have more.") and provides players with greater autonomy in deciding when and how to engage with the game.

=== Achievements and milestone systems ===
To sustain engagement, many incremental games implement systems of achievements, offering small, frequent rewards throughout gameplay. These systems provide structure and direction, encouraging players to optimize their strategies and reinforcing a sense of accomplishment through tangible milestones.

=== Prestige ===
Some incremental games incorporate a mechanic that allows players to reset their progress in exchange for advantages in subsequent playthroughs. This concept is similar to the "New Game Plus" feature found in other video game genres, but in incremental games the reset—often referred to as "prestige"—typically grants permanent rewards or bonuses that persist across all future runs. These rewards create an additional gameplay loop: when progression slows, players can strategically reset to accelerate future advancement. Deciding the optimal timing and method for a reset becomes part of the game's strategic depth. After a prestige reset, previously time-consuming stages can be cleared much faster, giving players a renewed sense of progress and empowerment. Clicker Heroes by Playsaurus is considered an early pioneer of prestige mechanics in mobile gaming.

Some games feature multiple layers of prestige systems, unlocking entirely new content, meta-currencies, or gameplay modes. For example, Realm Grinder by Divine Games incorporates layered progression systems such as "abdicating", "reincarnating", and "ascending".

=== Open-ended or closed gameplay loops ===
Incremental games vary as to whether they have a victory condition: games like Cookie Clicker allow the players to play indefinitely, while games like Candy Box! or Universal Paperclips feature endings that can be reached after a certain amount of progress is made.

=== Microtransaction and monetization ===
Pioneered by AdVenture Capitalist, developers may sell premium boost such as instant currency infusion (usually a percentage of current rate of income) or sometimes wrapped as a "time-warp" (instantly gain x-hours of future income), permanent boost multiplier that persists after each prestiging, instant prestige (claiming prestige without starting over), protection against negative events, gacha system (random draws of a character or a permanent bonus), and event currencies.

On the other side, they may also deliver advertisements for players to receive minor rewards, such as a short burst of cash, doubling offline earnings, a small amount of premium currency, brief powerful boost/medium-length small boost, extra prestige points upon prestiging, relief of a negative status, etc.

== History ==
Candy Box!, a predecessor of Cookie Clicker

According to Anthony Pecorella in his GDC summit talks, the creation of the idle game genre was attributed to Progress Quest (2002) by Eric Fredriksen, a parody of character stat progression and automated combat systems in MMORPGs. He argued that the gaming website Kongregate was an early hub for the genre, as some people preferred to use the integrated chat rather than actively play. The first idle game on Kongregate was aptly titled Kongregate Chat, where the game ran by itself while players conversed in the chat window. One of the first visual idle games ("rudimentary RPGs", according to Pecorella) was Ayumilove's HackerStory v1, a parody of bot grinding in MapleStory, a popular Korean MMORPG at the time.

The early pioneers of idle games also saw some games parodying the genre, such as Anti-Idle which has elements of both active and idle games. The game was extremely complicated, content-rich, and constantly updated. An idle game on the Facebook platform, called Cow Clicker, which according to the author is, "a satire and playable theory of social games circa that era, ... Facebook games distilled to their essence.", was the first to receive mainstream media attention. Another parody of idle games (and of capitalism), called AdVenture Capitalist, also saw success as a browser game and was subsequently made available on other platforms. It was one of the first games to implement monetization, as well as an offline earning system which tracks a player's progress while the game is not running, unlike previous browser-based idle games which only advanced when open in a browser window.

Some idle games did not follow the infinite ending and instead opted for a puzzle-like or exploration-based structure. Examples include A Dark Room and Candy Box!.

Incremental games gained popularity in 2013 after the success of Cookie Clicker, although earlier games such as Cow Clicker and Candy Box! were based on the same principles. Make It Rain was the first major mobile idle game success, although the idle elements in the game were heavily limited, requiring check-ins to progress. In 2015, the gaming press observed such games proliferating on the Steam distribution platform with titles such as Clicker Heroes.

Other idle games that have become classics include Sandcastle Builder which was based on the xkcd comic 1190: "Time", Shark Game, Crank, Mr.Mine, and Kittens Game.

During the evolution of the genre, monetization (through ads or other venues), premium content, and other game mechanics were slowly being added in.

== Reception ==
Nathan Grayson of Kotaku attributed the popularity of idle games to their ability to provide low-effort, unchallenging distractions that integrate easily into a person's daily routine, while adopting themes and aesthetics of more complex video games to appeal to a "core gamer" audience. He also observed that the genre supports a wide variety of mechanics and settings, including fantasy, sci-fi, and even erotica, offering enough perceived depth to maintain player engagement.

IGN's Justin Davis describes the genre as designed for a perpetual sense of escalation: costly upgrades and items become available rapidly, only to be rendered trivial and replaced by more expensive options. This pacing creates a paradoxical experience where players feel both powerful and weak simultaneously, as they chase exponential growth.

Julien "Orteil" Thiennot, creator of games such as Cookie Clicker, has described his own works as "non-games". In early 2014, Orteil released an early version of Idle Game Maker, a browser-based tool that enables the creation of customized idle games without programming knowledge.

On the parodic nature of idle games, Pecorella commented that "this is sorta a genre that almost doesn't want to exist; it's a joke, but despite itself, keeps being really successful", and on popular idle-games in general, "a lot of these are just glorified spreadsheets with some really neat mechanics in it."

== Influence ==
The idle games genre has influenced a range of other genres. Pecorella identified several genres that incorporate idle elements into their mechanics. Real-time social and strategy games such as Hay Day, Mafia Wars and Game of War let the player progress while they are away. Certain Chinese MMORPGs allow players to skip the early-game through "AFK mode" and to go straight to the end-game. Examples include Mythborne and Wartune. Shooter games, RPGs, and other genres have adopted short prestige loops or mini idle games, while others implemented offline progression to encourage players to return.

== Auto clicker ==
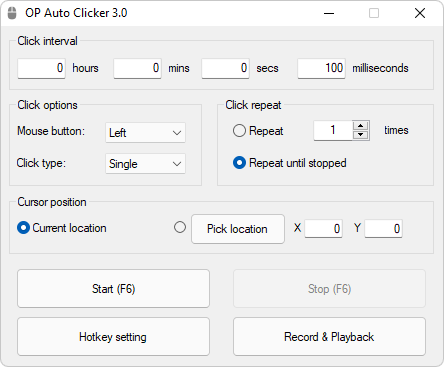
An example of auto clicker software

An auto clicker is automation software or a macro designed to automate mouse clicks. Many incremental games employ active clicking as a means of gaining currency to complement passive progression. Players sometimes use auto clickers to automate this part and accelerate resource accumulation. Pecorella, in his 2016 GDC summit talk, argued that auto clickers are considered necessary by any "serious" idle game player and that their use reflects a design flaw rather than cheating.
