= Auto clicker =

Program to automate clicking the mouse

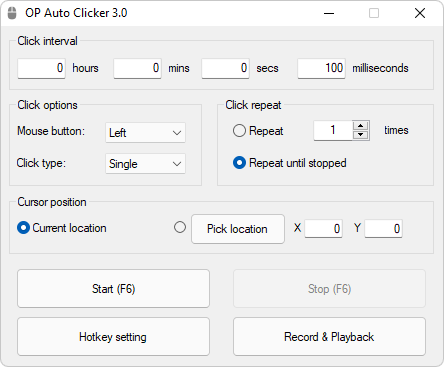
Example of a basic auto clicker GUI

An auto clicker is a type of software or macro that can be used to automate the clicking of a mouse on a computer screen element. Some clickers can be triggered to repeat recorded input.

Auto clickers can be as simple as a program that simulates mouse clicking. This type of auto clicker is fairly generic and will often work alongside any other computer program running at the time and acting as though a physical mouse button is pressed.

Auto clickers are also called automation software programs, and may have features enabling response conditional reactions, as well as a keyboard and mouse.

== Applications ==
An auto clicker has different applications depending upon the type of task required to be automated. Following are a few examples where auto clickers are used.

- Software testing: Software testing can be tedious for a human when there are many UI elements that have to be tested repeatedly. In such cases, specialized macros can be created and auto clickers that test the software elements.
- Data entry automation: For repetitive data entry operations, an auto clicker can be used to replicate the sequence of operations and automating the process, saving time and with minimal chance of error. More complex data entry operations cannot be automated using an auto clicker.
- Gaming: Some gamers use auto clickers to perform game actions such as attacking or shooting automatically, or to accelerate their clicking speed in games like Minecraft, Roblox and various idle games. In some multiplayer games where an auto clicker would give a player an unfair advantage, the software is able to detect the use of an auto clicker and ban the user from playing competitively.
- Hacktivism: The browser extension AdNauseam was developed to protest mass surveillance conducted by adverting companies on the internet. It hides advertisements from the user's view and automatically generates false advertisement clicks on websites, in an aim to increase the financial costs to advertising companies.

A U.S. Department of Veterans Affairs technology entry describes Free Mouse Auto Clicker as software that performs mouse clicks at intervals specified by the user. The entry notes that users can configure the interval between clicks.

== Hardware ==
Auto-fire control switch on a Quickshot II joystick

Whilst an auto clicker is software that is emulating mouse clicks, there is hardware that can do this for itself. Some computer mice marketed as "gaming mice" sometimes have an autoclicker built-in which will click at a user determined rate. Similarly, some computer joysticks have an auto-fire function which can usually be adjusted to a specific rate of fire.

== List of auto-clicker development tools ==
=== Windows ===
- AutoIt
- Macro Express
- iMacros
- Expect
- AutoHotkey

=== macOS ===
- Automator

=== Linux ===
- AutoKey

=== Web-based ===
- Bookmarklet
- iMacros

== See also ==
- Incremental games, which this software may be applied to
