= VisualCron =

- Developer: NetCart AB
- Stable release: 11.0.0 (January 29, 2024; 22 months ago) [±]
- Operating system: Windows XP and later
- Platform: IA-32 and x86-64
- Available in: 100 languages
- Type: Job scheduler
- License: Shareware
- Website: visualcron.com

VisualCron is a job scheduler and automation tool for Windows.

== Overview ==
VisualCron is a replacement for the Windows Task Scheduler and a similar cron job scheduler in Unix-like operating systems. The software is split into client and server parts, with the former being invoked by the user on demand and the latter always running as a process in the background. Due to the client-server architecture of the program, the administrator can use a single client to manage several servers over the network.

The client side of VisualCron is a graphical program that allows the administrator to manage jobs and view logs of the software's activities. The log viewer also allows searching for events based on queries, defining event type, time of execution, message content and other parameters.

== Jobs ==
A VisualCron job consists of six elements: triggers, tasks, notifications, time exceptions, conditions, and timeouts. Like the Windows Task Scheduler, VisualCron allows user to bind several options for each job. The program provides the set of triggers and task types that the administrator can choose among; after the job is run, the user-configured notification is issued. The built-in tasks include file operations, SQL queries, system restart, and executing user-defined macros.

== Reception ==
Reviewing the program, Joshua Hoskins of TechRepublic praised the flexibility of the program while noting the difficulties of setting up the jobs: "The setup of the VisualCron monitors was slightly more difficult that expected. This was understandable though due to the massive power difference I was using. It was very quickly apparent that this tool was magnitude[s] of power greater than the solution I was currently using." Codrut Nistor of Softpedia also noted the high quality of the program's documentation, though he said that "Beginners may not find this program useful and easy to learn, while people who don't need to enable advanced scheduled tasks may find the [$47] price tag a bit high."

== See also ==
- AutoIt
- AutoKey (for Linux)
- AutoHotkey
- Automator (for Macintosh)
- Automise
- Keyboard Maestro (for Macintosh)
