= KiXtart =

Scripting language for Windows

- Developer: Ruud van Velsen
- Release: 1991; 35 years ago
- Stable release: 4.70 / October 17, 2022; 4 years ago
- Operating system: Microsoft Windows
- Type: Scripting language Automation
- License: Closed source Careware
- Website: kixtart.org

KiXtart is a closed source free-format scripting language for Windows. It is described as a logon script processor and enhanced batch scripting language by the official website. Its name is a portmanteau of "kick start".

== Overview ==
KiXtart is developed by Ruud van Velsen of Microsoft Netherlands. It is now provided as careware. Development started in 1991 to provide login scripting for the Microsoft LAN Manager environment.

It has rich built-in functionality for easy scripting and provides access to ADSI, ADO, WMI, etc. The language can be used to display information, set environment variables, start programs, connect to network drives, read or edit the registry, change the current drive and directory, and much more.

With KiXforms, the user can create a GUI for KiXtart.

=== Code example ===
Read the Windows product ID

; Read value from registry
$ProductID = ReadValue("HKEY_LOCAL_MACHINE\Software\Microsoft\Windows NT\CurrentVersion","ProductId")

; Display result or error message
If @ERROR = 0
    ? "ProductID=$ProductID"
Else
    ? "Error reading product ID"
Endif
?

; Done
Exit @ERROR

== Versions ==
Development of KiXtart as a logon scripting language started in 1991. Later versions were released on these dates:

- 3.63 23 October 2000

KiXtart 2001

- 4.00 19 November 2001
- 4.02 21 January 2002
- 4.10 8 July 2002
- 4.11 26 August 2002
- 4.12 11 November 2002
- 4.20 17 February 2003
- 4.21 15 July 2003
- 4.22 14 November 2003
- 4.23 31 December 2004

KiXtart 2010

- 4.50 1 July 2005
- 4.51 6 October 2005
- 4.52 21 July 2006
- 4.53 15 September 2006
- 4.60 3 October 2007
- 4.61 24 September 2009
- 4.62 12 August 2011
- 4.63 4 September 2012
- 4.64 25 February 2014
- 4.66 24 July 2015
- 4.67 10 October 2016
- 4.70 17 October 2022

== Books ==
- Kelly, Bob. Start to Finish Guide to Scripting with KiXtart / Bob Kelly. Greenland, NH : Agility Press, 2004. ISBN 1-932577-09-2
- Jesse M. Torres. Windows Admin Scripting Little Black Book, 3rd Edition / Jesse M. Torres. Paraglyph Press, 2006. ISBN 1-933097-10-8

== See also ==
- AutoHotKey
- AutoIt
- AutoKey (for Linux)
- Automator (for Macintosh)
- Automise
- Bookmarklet
- FastTrack Scripting Host
- iMacros for Firefox
- Macro Express
- Winbatch
