= Keyboard Maestro =

App for creating automations in MacOS

- Developer: Stairways Software
- Stable release: 11.0.4 / May 20, 2025; 7 months ago
- Operating system: macOS
- Type: Automation utility
- Website: www.keyboardmaestro.com

Keyboard Maestro is a closed-source commercial macOS-based application that allows automation of routine functions, such as navigating running applications, opening documents, typing text, expanding abbreviations, and controlling web applications, by means of a visual programming language with support for variables, styled clipboards, functions and text tokens, if-then-else logic, loops and other functions.

Features include recording and designing macros, clipboard history, saved clipboards, and navigation through applications and windows. Macros are organised into groups which can be limited to operate within certain applications.

Keyboard Maestro was created and first released in 2002 by Michael Kamprath and purchased by Stairways Software in 2004, and has been in continuous development since then.

== See also ==
- AutoHotkey (for Windows)
- AutoIt (for Windows)
- AutoKey (for Linux)
- Automise (for Windows)
- Automator (for macOS)
- Bookmarklet (for Windows)
- iMacros for Firefox (for Windows)
- KiXtart (for Windows)
- Macro Express (for Windows)
