= Xnee =

- Developers: GNU Project, Henrik Sandklef
- Stable release: 3.19 / May 6, 2014; 12 years ago
- Operating system: X11
- Type: X11 Test
- License: GNU General Public License
- Website: www.sandklef.com/xnee
- Repository: cvs.savannah.gnu.org/viewvc/xnee/

GNU Xnee is a suite of programs that can record, replay and distribute user actions under the X11 environment. It can be used for testing and demonstrating X11 applications. Within X11 each user input (mouse click or key press) is an X Window System event. Xnee records these events into a file. Later Xnee is used to play the events back from the file and into an X Window System just as though the user were operating the system. Xnee can also be used to play or distribute user input events to two or more machines in parallel. As the target X Window application sees what appears to be physical user input it has resulted in Xnee being dubbed “Xnee is Not an Event Emulator.”

As Xnee is free software, it can be modified to handle special tasks. For example, inserting time stamps as part of the playback. It can also be used to automate tasks, like distributing actions (e.g. teacher shows students) and changing files.

== Software suite ==
- cnee is a command line interface version of Xnee (recursive acronym of “cnee's not an event emulator”).
- gnee is a graphical interface (recursive acronym of “gnee's not an emulator either”).
- pnee is a GNOME applet (recursive acronym of “pnee's not even emulating”).
- libxnee is a software library used by cnee, pnee and gnee. (recursive acronym of “libxnee is basically xnee”).

== See also ==
- AutoHotkey
- AutoIt
- Automator (for Macintosh)
- Automise
- Bookmarklet
