= Sal Soghoian =

American computer expert

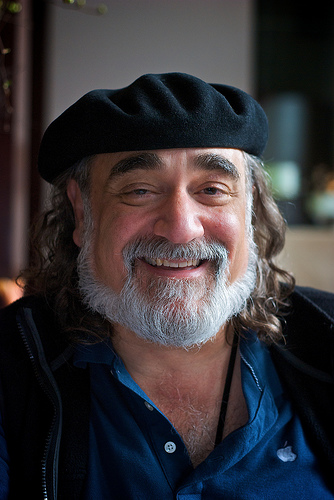
- Sal Soghoian at Macworld Expo in January 2009

Sal Soghoian is a user automation expert, software developer, author and musician. He joined Apple Inc. in January 1997 to serve as the Product Manager of Automation Technologies. These technologies include AppleScript, Services, the Terminal, Apple Configurator and Automator, among others. He left Apple in 2016 when his position was eliminated.

== Work with Apple ==
Soghoian has advanced Apple's incorporation of automation into its products by writing the scripting dictionaries for iWork, iPhoto, Aperture, and Photos, and the Mastered for iTunes automation tools. He designed and wrote the automation tools in the Apple Configurator application, which uses macOS automation to manage iOS device deployment. Apple Configurator consists of a central AppleScriptObj-C library and a set of Automator actions. Apple Configurator automation tools enable iOS devices to be prepared, managed and refreshed automatically upon their connection to a hosting macOS computer.

Soghoian's current projects include a collection of hundreds of voice-triggered dictation commands for controlling aspects of macOS, including the Keynote, Pages, Numbers, Photos, and the Finder applications. He created, hosts and manages a group of user automation resources at macosxautomation.com.

In late 2002, Soghoian joined an ad hoc team of engineers developing an application for creating and running automation workflows. After a year and a half of difficult but steady development, Soghoian showed the application to Steve Jobs. It was just one week before Apple's 2004 Worldwide Developers Conference (WWDC). Jobs was impressed with the new tool and asked Soghoian to appear at the WWDC keynote to demonstrate Automator for the first time to attendees. This innovative integrated workflow feature was introduced as part of Mac OS X v10.4 Tiger. Soghoian is one of the inventors of U.S. patent #7428535.

During Soghoian's tenure, Apple's native automation scripting language, AppleScript, was revived and upgraded to be PowerPC native in Mac OS 8.5. It was also successfully transitioned to Apple's UNIX-based operating system, Mac OS X, becoming integrated with the native IDE, which included Project Builder and Interface Builder (the precursors to Xcode).

In the evolving releases of OS X from Lion to Mavericks, AppleScript added library support and direct access to the Cocoa frameworks through AppleScriptObj-C, a powerful fusion of AppleScript and the Objective-C programming language. OS X Yosemite introduced JavaScript for Automation (JXA), a peer to AppleScript providing access to Apple Events and Cocoa through an enhanced version of JavaScript Core.

Soghoian was an advocate for AppleScript years before being employed by Apple. As a consultant, he created automation solutions for the publishing industry in the 1990s. Soghoian also authored a popular script collection called Sal's AppleScript Snippets, the ShadowCaster Quark XTension, two books, including AppleScript 1-2-3, and numerous magazine articles about automation. He was a special guest at one Leopard Tech Talk. He was a featured presenter for Quark, Thunder Lizard Productions, Apple, Seybold, and the Macworld conferences.

== Personal life ==
Sal Soghoian was born into an Armenian-American military family, and spent his childhood growing up on Marine and Naval bases, including Guantanamo Bay, Cuba, from which he was evacuated during the Cuban Missile Crisis. In his college years, he attended the University of Virginia in 1969 for a short time, but later moved to Boston where he earned a degree in music from the Berklee College of Music. In the late 1980s he returned to Charlottesville, Virginia, where he worked at the digital printshop "Pixels." Although he is known for his work at Apple, he is also an avid jazz musician. During his time in Charlottesville, he played guitar in a band called "Blue Indigo". The band is notable because it was composed of Carter Beauford (drummer), LeRoi Moore (Saxophone), George Melvin (Hammond B3 organ), and Soghoian (guitar). Beauford and Moore would go on to later musical fame as founding members of the Dave Matthews Band. Jeff Decker and Phil Riddle joined, following their departure.

He is the uncle of noted privacy researcher & activist, Christopher Soghoian.

== Bibliography ==
- Soghoian, Sal. (1994). The Quark XTensions Book/Book and Disk. Hayden Books. ISBN 1-56830-069-7.
- Soghoian, Sal; Cheeseman, Bill. (2009). Apple Training Series: AppleScript 1-2-3. Peachpit Press. ISBN 0-321-14931-9.

== Discography ==
- Blue Indigo, Catwalk
- Sal Soghoian, To Be with You
