= Macro Express =

Windows-based computer application

- Developer: Insight Software Solutions
- Stable release: 6.7.0.1 / November 12, 2025; 8 months ago (approximate)
- Operating system: Microsoft Windows
- Type: Automation utility
- Website: www.macros.com (no longer active)

Macro Express was a Windows-based application that allowed automation of routine functions, such as filling out web forms, opening programs, and performing mouse clicks, by means of a simple, specialized programming language with support for variables, if-then-else logic, loops and other functions.

Features included recording of the user's actions into macros, a visual programming language, assigning and manipulating variables, sending email, window repositioning and resizing, text file processing, and file manipulation. Macros could be launched via pressing a hotkey or typing characters, when a process starts or terminates, when a network connection has been made or released, when a file change occurred in a folder, or based on the contents of the clipboard.

Insight Software Solutions, Inc., the makers of Macro Express, closed permanently in late 2025.

== See also ==
- AutoIt – Scripting language to automate tasks in Microsoft Windows
- AutoKey – Linux desktop automation software
- AutoHotkey – Automation-focused scripting language for Windows
- Automator – macOS automation software
- Bookmarklet – Web browser bookmark containing JavaScript code
- iMacros – Browser-based application for macro recording, editing and playback for Firefox
- Keyboard Maestro – App for creating automations in MacOS
- KiXtart – Scripting language for Windows
