= Soghoian =

Soghoian is an Armenian surname. Notable people with the surname include:

- Christopher Soghoian (born 1981), American privacy researcher and activist
- Sal Soghoian, American user automation expert, software developer, author, and musician
