= Script Debugger =

Macintosh source-code editor

- Script Debugger icon
- Developer: Late Night Software
- Initial release: 1995; 31 years ago
- Final release: 8.0.10 / January 18, 2025; 11 months ago
- Operating system: macOS
- Platform: Macintosh: ARM, x86
- Type: AppleScript debugger
- License: proprietary freeware
- Website: www.latenightsw.com

Script Debugger is a Macintosh computer source-code editor and debugger environment for the programming languages AppleScript, and others based on Apple Inc.'s Open Scripting Architecture. It is a product of Late Night Software.

== History ==
Script Debugger version 1.0 was released in 1995 by Mark Alldritt as a third-party alternative to Apple's freeware application, Script Editor. Its competitors at that time included ScriptWizard and Main Event Software's popular Scripter. As of 2024, those two products are defunct, leaving only Satimage's Smile and integrated development environments such as FaceSpan (also from Late Night) and AppleScript Studio as Script Debugger's competitors in the field.

Version 1 contained several notable features, such as: it was "scriptable" (it could be used to create scripts to control itself), recordable (it could create scripts based on user actions), and attachable (scripts could be written to respond to events). More importantly, the program now allowed inspection of running applications to see what events they were emitting. The new utility also contained a full debugger, with support for breakpoints.

The program has since won many awards in the Macintosh scripting community. Version 1 received "5 mice" from MacUser and 4 stars from MacWEEK. Version 2 received the 2000 Macworld Eddy for "Best Development Software", and received "4.5 mice" from both MacUser and Macworld.

On February 9, 2006, version 4 was released. This version was completely rewritten to take advantage of the new Cocoa and Tiger APIs. The new release also included an improved version of the JavaScript OSA scripting component.

Version 5 was released in June 2012.

Version 6 was released in June 2016, with support for new features such as code folding and AppleScriptObjC.

Version 7 was released in March 2018, introducing the free "Lite" mode and new features such as version browsing, enhanced applets, and better bundle editing.

Version 8 was released in May 2021, introducing support for macOS Big Sur and Apple Silicon. Other notable features include support for Dark Mode, and for generating standalone script applications that support code signing and notarizing.

On January 1, 2025, Mark Aldritt announced the planned retirement of Script Debugger. On May 31, 2025, it was officially retired. As of June 2025, all macOS versions from 4.0 – 8.0.10 are available as freeware downloads. The Late Night Software website hosts the full software retirement announcement, Mark's goodbye note, and a list of all freely downloadable versions on a downloads page. The Forum web pages will remain available, and user-to-user discussions will be encouraged and supported.

Script Debugger has been around for over 30 years and has helped countless AppleScript developers over the years. Thank you Mark Aldritt and everyone else who helped make this software so great over all those years. Many people's lives were made a little bit easier and more productive thanks to all the effort that went in to making this a product that was so fun to use and so productive, and some were made a whole lot easier. Thank You, Thank You, Thank You to Mark and Shane and all the others who made this software so fun and so helpful to so many people over three decades.
