= Automator =

Automator may refer to:

- Dan 'The Automator' Nakamura, a hip-hop and rap producer
- Automator, a feature of macOS
