= CoScripter =

Discontinued browser based macro recorder, developed by IBM research

CoScripter (formerly Koala) is a discontinued a browser-based macro recorder developed by IBM Research. Implemented as an extension for the Mozilla Firefox browser, it records user actions and saves them in semi-natural language scripts. The scripts made are saved in a central wiki for sharing with other users. CoScripter aims at end-users through the use of programming by demonstration, a technique to create automated tasks without using a programming language.

== See also ==
iMacros - Web browser macro recorder, similar to CoScripter. First release 2001.
