= CoComment =

coComment
- Founded: February 2006
- Dissolved: March 2012
- Headquarters: Geneva
- Website: www.cocomment.com
- Current status: Defunct

coComment was an online service that let users keep track of their comments on any website. The service was based in Geneva, Switzerland, and founded in February 2006 (20 years ago) by Swisscom. After a user installed the coComment bookmarklet or web browser plug-in, they could use it to track their comments and any replies to their comments on any webpage that they visit. The service had over 1.3 million users as of July 1, 2008.

== Shut down ==
coComment was switched off in March 2012 (14 years ago).
