= Christopher Soghoian =

American computer scientist (born 1981)

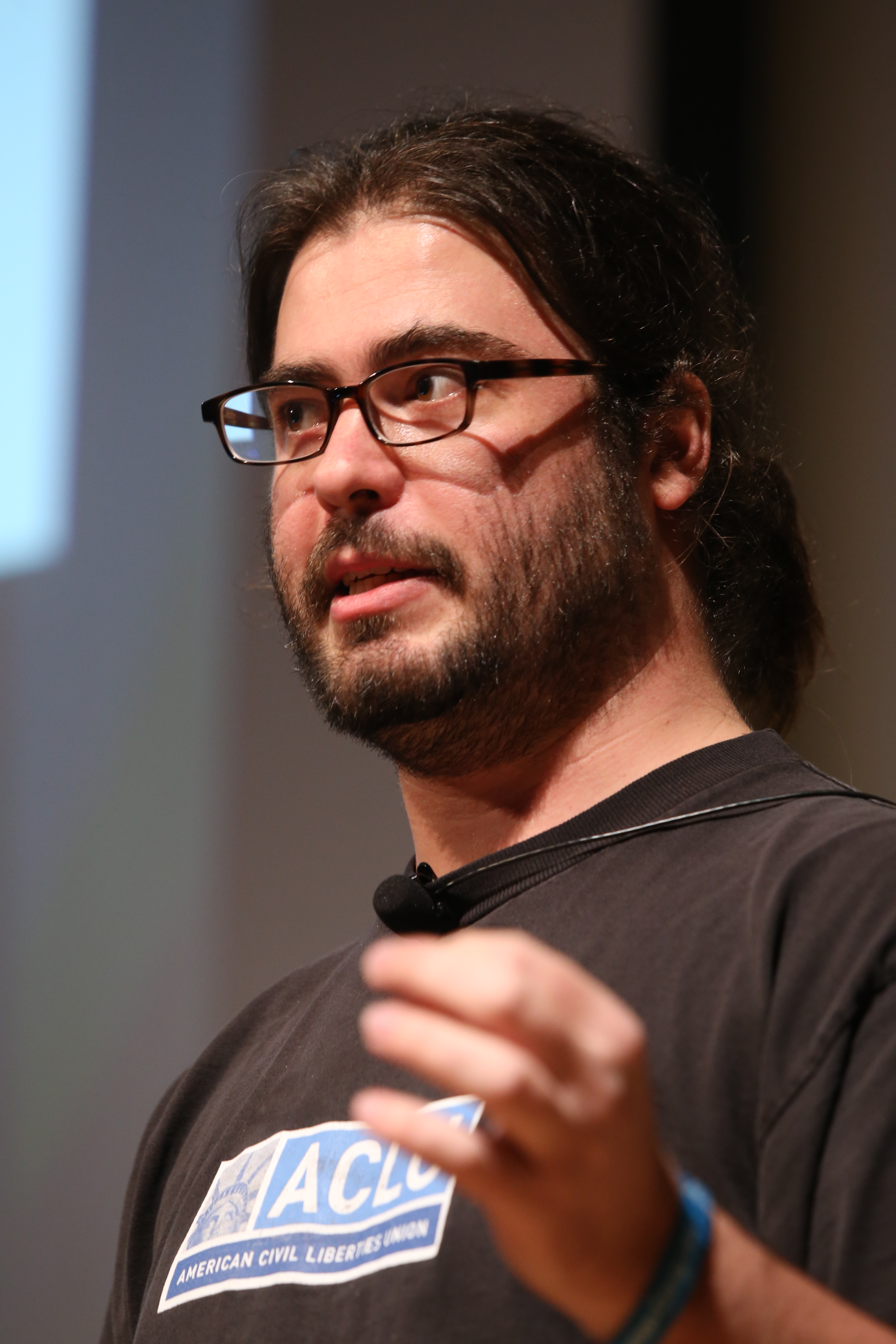
- Soghoian in 2013
- Born: 1981 (age 44–45); San Francisco, California, U.S.
- Education: James Madison University (BS); Johns Hopkins University (MS); Indiana University Bloomington (PhD)
- Occupations: Researcher and activist
- Known for: Security and privacy activism
- Website: Dubfire.net

Christopher Soghoian (born 1981) is a privacy researcher and activist. He is currently working for Senator Ron Wyden as the senator's Senior Advisor for Privacy & Cybersecurity. From 2012 to 2016, he was the principal technologist at the American Civil Liberties Union.

== Education ==
Soghoian, who holds British and US nationality, received a B.S. from James Madison University (Computer Science; 2002), a Masters from Johns Hopkins University (Security Informatics; 2005), and a PhD from Indiana University Bloomington (Informatics; 2012). His dissertation focused on the role that third-party internet and telecommunications service providers play in facilitating law enforcement surveillance of their customers.

Soghoian is a visiting fellow at Yale Law School's Information Society Project and a TED Senior Fellow. He was previously an Open Society Foundations Fellow and a Student Fellow at the Berkman Center for Internet & Society at Harvard University.

== Security research and activism ==
Soghoian's research and advocacy is largely focused on government surveillance. His research has shed significant light on the use of sophisticated surveillance technologies by US law enforcement agencies, exposing such techniques to public debate and criticism.

Soghoian first gained public attention in 2006 as the creator of a website that generated fake airline boarding passes. On October 26, 2006, Soghoian created a website that allowed visitors to generate fake boarding passes for Northwest Airlines. While users could change the boarding document to have any name, flight number or city that they wished, the generator defaulted to creating a document for Osama bin Laden. Soghoian claimed that his motivation for the website was to focus national attention on the ease with which a passenger could evade the No Fly List. Information describing the security vulnerabilities associated with boarding pass modification had been widely publicized by others before, including Senator Charles Schumer (D-NY) and security expert Bruce Schneier. On October 27, 2006, then-Congressman Edward Markey called for Soghoian's arrest. At 2 am on October 28, 2006, his home was raided by agents of the FBI to seize computers and other materials. Soghoian's Internet service provider voluntarily shut down the website, after it received a letter from the FBI claiming that the site posed a national security threat. On October 29, 2006, Congressman Markey issued a revised statement stating that Soghoian should not go to jail, and that instead, the Department of Homeland Security should "put him to work" to fix the boarding pass security flaws. The FBI closed its criminal investigation in November 2006 without filing any charges, as did the Transportation Security Administration in June 2007.

In June 2009, Soghoian co-authored an open letter to Google with 37 prominent security and privacy experts, urging the company to protect the privacy of its customers by enabling HTTPS encryption by default for Gmail and its other cloud based services. In January 2010, Google enabled HTTPS by default for users of Gmail, and subsequently for other products, including search. According to Google, it was already considering HTTPS by default. Soghoian has in recent years continued his HTTPS advocacy, calling on news media, law firms, government agencies and other organizations to encrypt their own websites.

In December 2009, while an employee of the Federal Trade Commission, Soghoian secretly audio recorded a closed-door surveillance industry conference. The agency's inspector general opened an investigation into Soghoian's conduct, and he was subsequently let go from the FTC. In the recording, an executive from Sprint Nextel revealed that the company had created a special website through which law enforcement agents can obtain GPS information on subscribers and that the website had been used to process 8 million requests during the previous year. That recording was subsequently cited by Alex Kozinski, Chief Judge of the Ninth Circuit Court of Appeals in U.S. v. Pineda-Moreno, in support of his view that "1984 may have come a bit later than predicted, but it's here at last".

External videos
- Government surveillance — this is just the beginning on YouTube, Christopher Soghoian, TED talks, March 5, 2014

Between 2009 and 2010, he worked for the US Federal Trade Commission as the first ever in-house technical advisor to the Division of Privacy and Identity Protection. While at the FTC, he assisted with investigations of Facebook, Twitter, MySpace and Netflix.

In October 2010, Soghoian filed a complaint with the FTC, in which he claimed that Google was intentionally leaking search queries to the sites that users visited after they clicked on a link from the search results page. Two weeks later, a law firm filed a class action lawsuit against Google for this practice. The lawsuit extensively quoted from Soghoian's FTC complaint. In October 2011, Google stopped leaking search queries to the sites that users visited, and then in 2015, the company settled the search query leakage class action lawsuit for 8.5 million dollars.

In May 2011, Soghoian was approached by public relations firm Burson-Marsteller and asked to write an anti-Google op-ed, criticizing the company for privacy issues associated with its social search product. Soghoian refused, and instead published the email conversation. A subsequent investigation by journalists revealed that the PR firm, which had refused to identify its client to Soghoian, had been retained by Facebook.

In May 2011, Soghoian filed a complaint with the FTC, in which he claimed that online backup service Dropbox was deceiving its customers about the security of its services. Soon after Soghoian first publicly voiced his concerns, Dropbox updated its terms of service and privacy policy to make it clear that the company does not in fact encrypt user data with a key only known to the user, and that the company can disclose users' private data if forced to by law enforcement agencies.

In a February 2012, public speech, Soghoian criticized the commercial market for so called zero-day security vulnerabilities, a topic which, until then, had yet to receive significant attention from the mainstream press. One month later, Soghoian was quoted by Forbes, in a lengthy article about the zero day market, describing the firms and individuals who sell software exploits as "the modern-day merchants of death" selling "the bullets of cyberwar". Over the next several years, several major media outlets published their own front-page stories on the industry, often with quotes from Soghoian criticizing those providing such hacking software to governments.

In an August 2013, presentation at the hacker conference DEF CON, Soghoian highlighted the existence of a dedicated FBI team that delivers malware to the computers and mobile devices of surveillance targets. In his presentation, Soghoian stated that he discovered the team by reading heavily redacted government documents and by looking at the profiles of ex-FBI contractors on the social network website LinkedIn. In October 2014, Soghoian called attention to the fact that the FBI had, in 2007, impersonated the Associated Press in an effort to deliver malware to a teenager in Washington state who had threatened to bomb his high school. This act of deception was strongly condemned by leading news organizations, including by the General Counsel of the Associated Press.

== Personal life ==
Soghoian is the nephew of Armenian-American Sal Soghoian, the former Automation Product Manager at Apple Inc., responsible for AppleScript and Apple Automator.
