= OSAX =

OSAX or OSax may refer to:

- Old Saxon language
- Open Scripting Architecture extensions
