= JavaScript OSA =

Macintosh scripting language

- Paradigms: Multi-paradigm: object-oriented (prototype-based), functional, imperative, scripting
- Family: ECMAScript
- Developer: Late Night Software
- First appeared: May 11, 2001; 25 years ago
- Final release: Final / 2012; 14 years ago
- Typing discipline: duck, weak, dynamic
- Scope: lexical
- Platform: Macintosh
- OS: macOS
- License: proprietary freeware

Influenced by
- AppleScript, JavaScript, ECMAScript

JavaScript Open Scripting Architecture (OSA), (originally JavaScript for OSA, then JavaScript OSA, abbreviated further as JSOSA), is a discontinued implementation of Open Scripting Architecture (a freeware inter-process communication scripting language for the Macintosh computer) in JavaScript.

JavaScript OSA uses the "core language" of the Mozilla implementation of the JavaScript programming language, (see SpiderMonkey). The language is used as an alternative to the AppleScript language. Its use is unrelated to web browser-based scripting. It can be seen as having a similar function to Microsoft's JScript .NET language on Windows machines, but with no interoperability between the two languages' system-level scripting.

== Description ==
The language is identical to Mozilla's core language, with extensions added via a Core object and a MacOS object. The latter has methods for obtaining objects that are bound to application software. This is done via the Apple event messaging system, a part of the Macintosh's Open Scripting Architecture.

The language was first released in 2001, and was bundled with Late Night Software's flagship product, Script Debugger. In May 2005, a new "alpha" version of the language was made available for testing. This improved second version of the language was bundled with version 4 of Script Debugger. JavaScript OSA was eventually discontinued due to lack of interest and was dropped from Script Debugger 5 in 2012.

== Alternatives ==
OS X Yosemite introduced JavaScript for Automation (JXA): system-wide support for scripting with JavaScript, built upon JavaScriptCore and the Open Scripting Architecture. It features an Objective-C bridge which enables entire Cocoa applications to be programmed in JavaScript.
