= Daniel Howe (disambiguation) =

Daniel Howe (born 1995) is an Australian rules footballer.

Daniel or Dan Howe may also refer to:

- Daniel Walker Howe (1937–2025), American historian
- Dan Howe (born 1970), Canadian canoeist
- Daniel Howe, developer of AdNauseam browser extension
