= Spam Bully =

Anti-spam software

Spam Bully is anti-spam software made by Axaware, LLC. SpamBully uses Bayesian filtering to separate good emails from spam emails. Spam Bully 3 included a feature which performed automated clicks on spam mail, similar to some other software, such as the later AdNauseam browser extension. The features include the ability to report spammers to their providers and the FTC, the option of converting the SpamBully toolbar into a variety of languages including Spanish, German, Italian and Russian.
