= FastTrack Automation Studio =

FastTrack Automation Studio (formerly known as FastTrack Scripting Host), often referred to as just FastTrack, is a scripting language for Windows IT System Administrators. The product’s goal is to handle any kind of scripting that might be required to automate processes with Microsoft Windows networks.

== Manufacturer ==
FastTrack is produced by FastTrack Software, which is headquartered in Aalborg, Denmark. The product is promoted by the manufacturer as a one-stop shop for Windows script writers and its development paradigm is “one operation = one script line”. Script writers use a purpose-built editor to create scripts, inserting script lines via menus, drag’n drop, or simply typing them in. Scripts may be used out of the box, created from scratch, imported from forums or other users, or customized from product documentation.

== Types of scripts ==
Simple scripts include:

- Outlook Signatures
- Login scripts
- Backup and replication scripts
- Inventory and asset management
- Automated Windows OS installation and deployment
- Automated application software deployment
- Active Directory scripts

More advanced scripts include:

- SCCM task sequences
- Citrix ICA and RDP Clients built-in
- Deploying applications to server farms
- Deploying GPO MSI files
- SQL Server scripts

== Basic structure ==
Under the hood, scripts comprise commands, functions, collections, and conditions. When a script is executed these components are converted into many lines of C# code, sometimes hundreds of lines, depending on the particular script operation. Scripts can be compiled into EXE files or MSI packages and treated as standalone Windows applications.

== History ==
FastTrack Scripting Host (FastTrack) was first developed around 2006 to ease the administration burden of IT System Administrators on Windows networks.

=== Product idea ===
The idea for the product came from founder and President of FastTrack Software, Lars Pedersen, who has a background in systems administration. Previously with Telenor, Denmark’s major telephone company, Pedersen performed various roles in systems administration, programming and web development. He also worked as a consultant and developer on several major projects at various companies in Europe. Dissatisfied from his own experiences and frustrations administering Windows networks, Pederson looked for a way to make life easier for system administrators. In particular, he wanted something that could minimize the amount of time needed each day to perform routine and mundane tasks, which was a waste of time and expertise that should have been committed to other projects.

=== Development ===
Leading a small team of developers, Pedersen developed FastTrack Scripting Host to simplify and automate the routine tasks of system administrators. The resulting product is definitely a scripting language, but it can be used intuitively like a programming language, without requiring users to learn syntax or other concepts typically associated with programming languages.

=== Marketing ===
In April 2010, FastTrack Software entered into an agreement with Binary Research International, based in the city of Milwaukee, United States to market and sell the product globally.

=== Awards ===
FSH received a Windows IT Pro Community Choice award in 2012.

== Versions ==
The first version was produced in June 2006 and contained 51 components, which are the commands, functions, conditions and collections making up FastTrack. The following table summarizes dates and components for major releases. Companies and organizations such as NOAA, Kawasaki, and Goodyear have used and implemented the FastTrack Scripting Host.

Version	Date	Components
1.0	June 2006	51
2.0	February 2007	92
3.0	April 2008	144
4.0	January 2009	199
5.0	June 2010	240
6.0	August 2010	533
7.0	June 2011	741
7.3	May 2012	821
8.0	July 2012	~950
8.2	November 2012	1069

== Comparison with other scripting software ==
Product	Manufacturer	Cost	Licensing	Platform	Latest version	Website
FastTrack	FastTrack Software ALS	Express - Free	Proprietary	Windows	8.2 (Nov 2012)	FastTrack Scripting Host
KiXtart	Ruud van Velsen of Microsoft Netherlands	CareWare - Donation	Proprietary	Windows	4.63 (Sep 2012)	KiXtart
PowerShell	Microsoft	Free	Proprietary	Windows	3.0 (~July 2010)	Microsoft PowerShell
ScriptLogic (PowerGUIPro)	Quest Software	$300	Proprietary	Windows	???	ScriptLogic
VBScript	Microsoft	Free	Proprietary	Windows	Depends on host application (https://msdn.microsoft.com/en-us/library/4y5y7bh5.aspx)	Microsoft VBScript

- FastTrack Scripting Host
- Kixtart
- PowerShell
- ScriptLogic
- VBScript
