= AutoKey =

Linux desktop automation software

- Developer: Thomas Hess
- Stable release: Python 3+ - 0.96.0 / June 6, 2022; 4 years ago
- Written in: Python
- Operating system: Linux
- Type: GUI Automation utility
- License: GPLv3
- Website: github.com/autokey/autokey
- Repository: github.com/autokey/autokey

AutoKey is a free, open-source scripting application for Linux.

AutoKey allows the user to define hotkeys and trigger phrases which expand to predefined text, automating frequent or repetitive tasks such as correcting typographical errors or common spelling mistakes and inserting boiler plate sections of text.

Hotkeys, and trigger phrases may also be configured to run scripts which use the full power of Python 3 to perform actions which can generate window, keyboard, and mouse events using the provided AutoKey API.

Most applications will respond to these events as if the user were actually typing on the keyboard and using the mouse. This allows AutoKey scripts to cause these applications to perform almost any sequence of actions a user could manually make them do - at the press of a single hotkey.

Since AutoKey scripts are written in full Python, they can also interact with the whole system to perform tasks which would be difficult for a user to do manually such as reading and writing files, retrieving system status information, or performing calculations and making decisions.

It also provides simple dialog management tools so scripts can present information and interact with the user.

== History ==
In 2008, Chris Dekter wrote the original version of AutoKey in Python 2 for the Linux operating system. The last version of the original branch was released on May 31, 2012 and is deprecated. On January 31, 2014, Guoci released the first Python 3 version.

AutoKey's UI was inspired by the commercial Windows software Phrase Express.

AutoKey is currently available in packaged form for users of Debian, Arch, Gentoo, and Fedora as well as for some of their derivative distributions such as Ubuntu, Mint, and Manjaro.

The software is licensed under GNU General Public License (GPLv3).

== See also ==
- AutoHotkey (for Windows only)
- AutoIt (for Windows only)
- Automator (for Macintosh only)
- Bookmarklet
- iMacros for Firefox
- Xnee, a program that can be used to record and replay test.
- SikuliX
