= Helen Nissenbaum =

American philosopher and information scientist

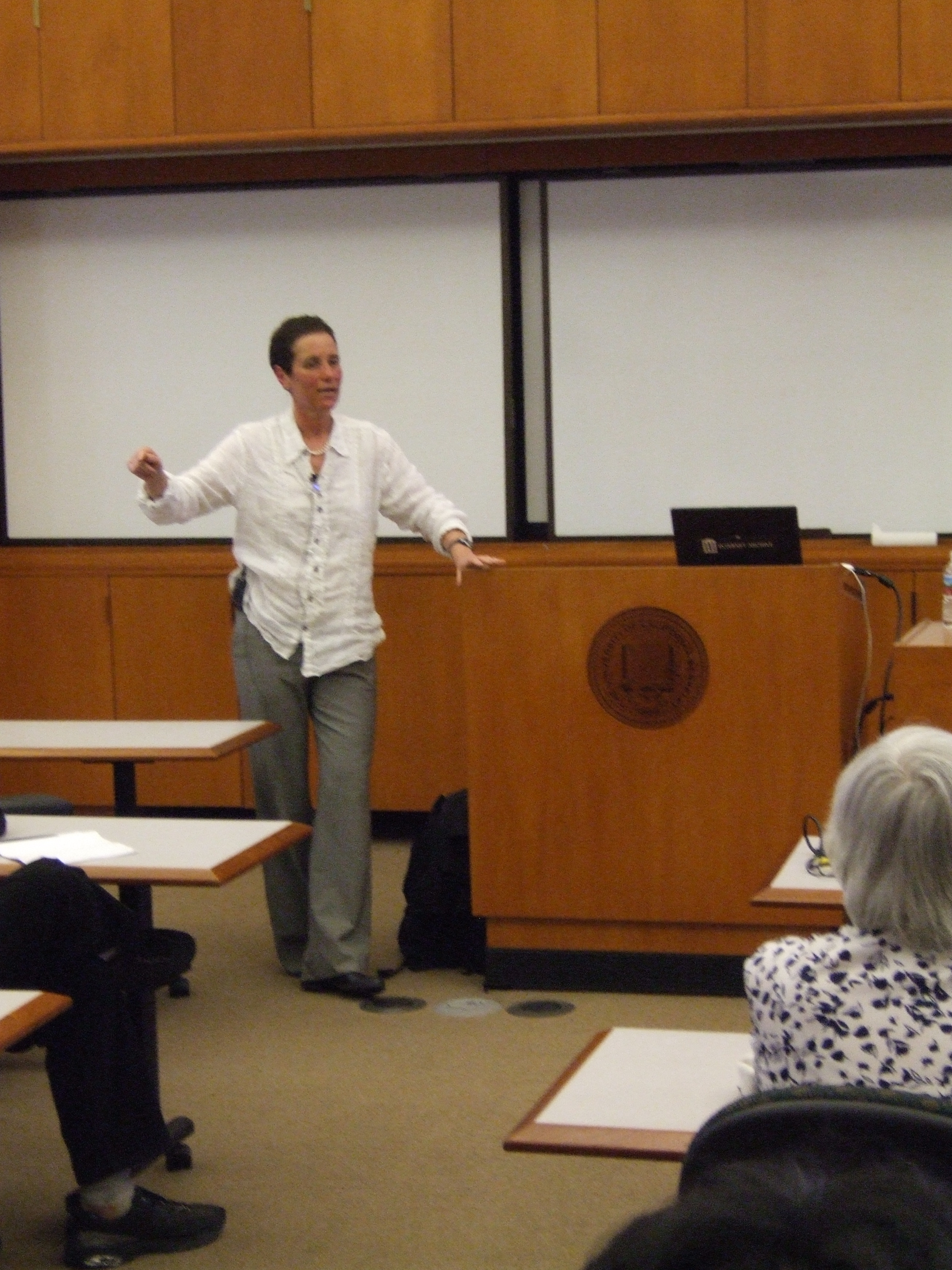
- Nissenbaum in 2008
- Education: University of the Witwatersrand; Stanford University
- Known for: Contextual integrity
- Awards: Barwise Prize (2014)
- Scientific career
- Fields: Information science, Human–Computer Interaction, Privacy, Digital Media
- Workplaces: Cornell Tech
- Website: nissenbaum.tech.cornell.edu

Helen Fay Nissenbaum is the Andrew H. and Ann R. Tisch Chaired professor of information science at Cornell Tech. She is best known for the concept of "contextual integrity" and her work on privacy, privacy law, trust, and security in the online world. Specifically, contextual integrity has influenced the United States government's thinking about privacy issues. Nissenbaum co-created the TrackMeNot and AdNauseam browser extensions, which demonstrated the use of obfuscation to maintain user privacy.

== Early life and education ==
Nissenbaum studied mathematics and philosophy at the University of the Witwatersrand in South Africa, graduating in 1976. She then went on to study at Stanford University, where she completed a master's degree in the social science of education in 1978, and a PhD in philosophy in 1983.

== Work ==
=== Grants ===
Nissenbaum has received grants from the National Science Foundation, Air Force Office of Scientific Research, Ford Foundation, the Hewlett Foundation the U.S. Department of Health and Human Services Office of the National Coordinator, and the Defense Advanced Research Projects Agency.

In 2018, Nissenbaum was invited to serve on the first ever external ethics Advisory Panel for Artificial Intelligence at SAP SE —the first European technology company to have an external AI ethics advisory panel.

=== Contextual Integrity ===
Nissenbaum is well known as the creator of the contextual integrity benchmark for privacy as an alternative to theories of privacy grounded in secrecy, data minimization, or procedural models based exclusively on notice-consent practices or encryption. One author stated that her article “Privacy as Contextual Integrity" has been "arguably the most influential article ever written about privacy in terms of shaping the direction of privacy research and its literature.”

Contextual integrity is defined as the appropriate flow of information from one party to the next, where what is appropriate is based on the social norms and expectations of an informational context. Social life and information happen in many contexts, not one context, and Nissenbaum argues that information flows should not be flowing into one undifferentiated pool but treated differently based on the context of transfer.

In Nissenbaum's model the particular context of an information flow is specified according to the five parameters of type of information, data subject, data sender, data recipient, and the transmission principle or understood constraints. Contextual integrity aims at user confidence that expectations around information sharing are generally met. Its "clear methodology and simple step-by-step framework" have garnered significant popularity including use by the Federal Trade Commission and a 2014 recommendation by the U.S. President’s Council of Advisors on Science and Technology.

The reliance on social norms which are inherently constructed, fungible, and contested has made some scholars question the viability of contextual integrity as a model that can support the creation of regulatory policy. Similarly, some critics have authored that it cannot be used to evaluate socially disruptive technologies precisely because emerging technologies which disrupt and cause norms in a given context cannot have sufficiently stable, shared expectations around information flows for CI to be an effective tool to assess what constitutes a privacy violation.

=== Ethics and Practices of Obfuscation ===
Nissenbaum has advocated in writing for obfuscation practices. Obfuscation strategies intentionally add extra information that dilutes the truthfulness and accuracy of information flows and disrupt data profiling and surveillance practices. On the internet, direct observation of user behavior cannot be avoided and many companies disregard regulatory and technical means by which individual users attempt to reject or turn off tracking. Given slow change in the regulatory environment and the inadequacy of notification-consent models of privacy to protect user interests, Nissenbaum justifies poisoning data through obfuscation “because of the asymmetrical power relations that have led to near total surveillance.” Obfuscation isn’t offered as a solution, but as a form of small scale resistance to users under duress. Obfuscation ultimately relies on other people not practicing obfuscation or the dissolution of a targeted advertising model of content-funding.

=== Browser extensions ===
She has also contributed to several browser extensions for Firefox and Chrome. TrackMeNot was the first extension that she co-created in 2006. TrackMeNot uses the notion of privacy through obfuscation to protect the user against online identification, surveillance, and profiling. Adnostic was created in 2013 to enable online ad targeting without compromising user's privacy.

AdNauseam, created in 2014, follows a similar obfuscation strategy for online ads. This plugin also pollutes the data gathered about user behavior in order to make it too difficult to create a user profile. It functions by clicking or opening all the ads on a viewed page that ignore a user’s Do Not Track preference in the background and introducing incorrect information about user preferences into web tracking systems. A user that opens all ads is as effectively targeted as a user who clicks none of them: because a specification of interests can’t be generated from this all-or-nothing behavior. This plugin was banned from the Chrome Web Store in 2017 and subsequently marked as malware to prevent installation through developer mode.

== Publications ==
Nissenbaum has written or edited a number of papers and books:

- Helen Nissenbaum (1986). Emotion and Focus. Cambridge University Press. ISBN 9780937073209.
- Johnson, Deborah G.; Nissenbaum, Helen, eds. (1995). Computers, Ethics & Social Values. Prentice Hall. ISBN 9780131031104.
- Nissenbaum, Helen; Price, Monroe E., eds. (2004). Academy & the Internet. Peter Lang. ISBN 9780820462035.
- Nissenbaum, Helen (2004), "Privacy as contextual integrity", Washington Law Review, vol. 79, p. 119
- Helen Nissenbaum (2009). Privacy in Context: Technology, Policy, and the Integrity of Social Life. Stanford, CA: Stanford University Press. ISBN 9780804772891.
- Lane, Julia; Stodden, Victoria; Bender, Stefan; Nissenbaum, Helen, eds. (2014). Privacy, Big Data, and the Public Good: Frameworks for Engagement. Cambridge University Press. ISBN 9781107067356.
- Mary Flanagan; Helen Nissenbaum, eds. (2014). Values at Play in Digital Games. Cambridge, MA: MIT Press. ISBN 9780262027663.
- Finn Brunton; Helen Nissenbaum (2015). Obfuscation: A User's Guide for Privacy and Protest. Cambridge, MA: MIT Press. ISBN 9780262029735.
- Nissenbaum, Helen, Katherine Strandburg, and Salomé Viljoen. "The great regulatory dodge." Harvard Journal of Law & Technology. 37 (2023): 1231.
- Engelmann, Severin, and Helen Nissenbaum. "Countering Privacy Nihilism." arXiv preprint arXiv:2507.18253 (2025).

== Honors and awards ==
- 2014 Barwise Prize of the American Philosophical Association
- 2017 honorary doctorate from the Leuphana University of Lüneburg
- 2019 distinguished fellow of the Stanford Institute for Human-Centered Artificial Intelligence
- 2021 Covey Award of the International Association of Computing and Philosophy
