= Bob Kelly (author) =

Bob Kelly (born April 17, 1971, in Massachusetts) best known as an expert on the deployment of the Microsoft Windows operating system.

Kelly was a cryptologic technician in the US Navy from 1989 to 1997, finishing his service as the systems administrator for communications system at the White House during the Clinton administration.

Bob Kelly is a subject-matter expert on Microsoft Windows deployment and Windows Installer technologies. He is the founder of AppDeploy.com – a resource focused on desktop management products and practices. He is author of the Start to Finish Guide to Scripting with KiXtart and The Definitive Guide to Windows Desktop Administration as well as several white papers and articles on similar topics. Kelly is also co-founder and president of iTripoli, Inc.– a software company focused on producing helpful tools for Windows administrators where he produces and supports applications like Admin Script Editor (a scripting editor for Windows Administrators).
