= AppleScript Editor =

Code editor for the AppleScript and Javascript for Automation scripting languages

Script Editor

- Script Editor running on macOS Monterey
- Developer: Apple
- Stable release: 2.11 / August 18, 2018; 7 years ago
- Operating system: Classic Mac OS, macOS
- Type: Source code editor
- License: Proprietary
- Website: developer.apple.com/library/archive/documentation/LanguagesUtilities/Conceptual/MacAutomationScriptingGuide/GettoKnowScriptEditor.html

Script Editor (called AppleScript Editor from 2009 to 2014) is a code editor for the AppleScript and Javascript for Automation scripting languages, included in classic Mac OS and macOS.

AppleScript Editor provides basic debugging capabilities and can save AppleScripts as plain text (.applescript), as a compiled script (.scpt), as a script bundle (.scptd), or as an application (.app). AppleScript Editor also handles script dictionary files, allowing the user to see what scripting classes and commands are available for each scriptable application installed on the computer.

Prior to Mac OS X 10.3, Script Editor was developed using Carbon. 10.3 introduced a new Script Editor written using Cocoa. It was called AppleScript Editor from Mac OS X 10.6 to 10.10, when the application added support for JavaScript for Automation.

== See also ==
- AppleScript § Development tools
