= AdNauseam =

Web ad blocker and auto clicker extension

- Original authors: Daniel Howe; Helen Nissenbaum; Mushon Zer-Aviv
- Developers: Daniel Howe; Sally Chen; Alberto Harres
- Release: 2014
- Platform: Mozilla Firefox; Google Chrome
- License: GPLv3
- Website: adnauseam.io
- Repository: github.com/dhowe/AdNauseam

AdNauseam is a free and open-source web browser extension that blocks Internet ads while automatically simulating clicks on them. Created in 2014 by Daniel Howe, Helen Nissenbaum, and Mushon Zer-Aviv, the software is a digital rights advocacy project that counters surveillance and data profiling employed by online advertising networks.

The extension functions on Mozilla Firefox and Google Chrome. Google banned AdNauseam from the Chrome Web Store in 2017. MIT Technology Review tested AdNauseam's effectiveness with Nissenbaum in a 2021 experiment, during which Google recognized most of AdNauseam's automated ad clicks as legitimate and billed a Google Ads test account accordingly.

== History ==
Prior to AdNauseam, co-creators Daniel Howe and Helen Nissenbaum released another extension, TrackMeNot, that masked the user's web queries by sending unrelated queries to search engines. Nissenbaum, a professor at New York University, published her book Obfuscation to explain how irrelevant data can be used to preserve user privacy.

In 2015, according to The Guardian, AdNauseam designer Mushon Zer-Aviv referred to the extension as "more art project than mass-rollout tech".

Howe released version 2.0 of the extension in July 2016 at the Hackers on Planet Earth conference. Version 3.0 became available in November 2016.

=== Ban from Chrome Web Store ===
Google banned AdNauseam from the Chrome Web Store in January 2017, citing the platform's developer agreement, which granted the company "the right to suspend or bar any Product from the Web Store at its sole discretion". When questioned by Fast Company, Google denied that AdNauseam's ad-clicking functionality triggered the ban, instead claiming that AdNauseam was removed for simultaneously blocking and concealing ads—a behavior exhibited by other extensions that Google continued to allow on the platform. AdNauseam had 60,000 users at the time of the ban, and was the first ad blocking extension designed for desktop computers that was banned from the Chrome Web Store. Users were initially able to bypass the ban by installing the extension in Google Chrome's developer mode, but Google subsequently marked AdNauseam as malware to prevent this workaround.

Zer-Aviv had previously anticipated the possibility of Google removing the extension and believed that the company did so to safeguard its use of advertising as an income source. Fast Company expected a competing ad blocker to be built into Chrome that would adhere to criteria published in March 2017 by the Coalition For Better Ads – an industry group that Google co-founded – that evaluated visual appeal instead of privacy considerations.

== Functionality ==
AdNauseam blocks and repeatedly sends click events to all ads served by web domains that ignore the user's Do Not Track preference. When it sends click events, AdNauseam introduces incorrect information about the user's preferences into web tracking systems used for targeted advertising, thereby impeding ad companies from profiling the user. The auto-clicking behavior additionally forces advertisers who pay per click to incur financial costs. The extension is initially configured to click on all eligible ads, and the user can change the proportion of ads it clicks on. AdNauseam's ad blocking feature is derived from the uBlock extension.

In a January 2021 experiment conducted in collaboration with Nissenbaum using test accounts on the Google Ads and Google AdSense platforms, MIT Technology Review confirmed that AdNauseam's automatic clicks of Google's ads on a test website accumulated expenses for a Google Ads advertiser account and revenue for an AdSense publisher account. Google processed transactions for ads clicked by AdNauseam on browsers operated by human users and on three of four browsers automated with the Selenium toolkit. The experiment ultimately gained $100 of income for the AdSense account, which MIT Technology Review interpreted as evidence of AdNauseam's efficacy.

== Reception ==
Electronic Frontier Foundation representative Alan Toner described AdNauseam as "a piece of agitprop theater" intended to "creatively protest the surveillance mechanism behind advertising".

In a MediaPost opinion piece, Fox Networks Group advertising executive Joe Marchese remarked that "AdNauseam aims to screw with the ad industry in ways that just using an ad blocker doesn't", and opined that the extension, "while obviously hostile to our industry, is extremely smart". Marchese believed that the advertising industry could use AdNauseam to raise awareness of ad fraud conducted by "layers of middlemen and shady ad networks".

Sean Blanchfield, CEO of anti-adblock consulting firm PageFair, expressed concern that when AdNauseam is used, "advertisers will not be able to distinguish it from deliberate click fraud" and that "if it gains popularity with technical users, its only achievement will be to destroy the businesses that run its users' favorite websites". Anti-bot technology vendor Solve Media's CEO, Ari Jacoby, accused AdNauseam of being "designed to defraud for sport" and "a sick display of the blatant disregard that some have for the symbiotic relationship between advertising and editorial that supports a free Internet"; InformationWeek rebutted that such a relationship had already been challenged by the growth of ad blocker usage.

== See also ==
- Hacktivism
- Privacy Badger
