= IMacros =

Browser-based application for macro recording, editing and playback

iMacros
- Original author: Ipswitch, Inc.
- Stable release: 12.5 / November 7, 2018; 7 years ago
- Operating system: Windows 7 or later
- Platform: IA-32 and x86-64
- Available in: English + 10 other languages
- Type: Form filler Scripting; Server monitoring Software testing Web scraping
- License: Proprietary commercial software
- Website: imacros.net

iMacros for Chrome
- Stable release: 10.0.5 / September 17, 2018; 7 years ago
- Platform: Google Chrome
- License: Freeware
- Website: www.iopus.com/iMacros/

iMacros for Firefox
- Stable release: 10.0.2.1450 / July 9, 2018; 7 years ago
- Platform: Mozilla Firefox
- License: Freeware
- Website: www.iopus.com/iMacros/

iMacros for Internet Explorer
- Stable release: 12.5 / November 7, 2018; 7 years ago
- Platform: Internet Explorer
- License: Freeware
- Website: www.iopus.com/iMacros/

iMacros was a browser-based application for macro recording, editing and playback for web automation and testing. It was provided as a standalone application and extension for Mozilla Firefox, Google Chrome, and Internet Explorer web browsers. Developed by iOpus/Ipswitch, it added record and replay functionality similar to that found in web testing and form filler software. The macros can be combined and controlled via JavaScript. Demo macros and JavaScript code examples were included with the software. Running strictly JavaScript-based macros was removed in later versions of iMacros browser extensions. However, users could use an alternative browser like Pale Moon, based on older versions of Mozilla Firefox to use JavaScript files for web-based automated testing with Moon Tester Tool.

The software has since been discontinued. It is no longer updated and no longer works properly in current web browser versions. After being discontinued, the website began redirecting to progress.com, and it is now no longer accessible at all.

== History ==
First created in 2001 by Mathias Roth, iMacros was the first macro recorder tool specifically designed and optimized for web browsers and form filling. In April 2012 iMacros was acquired by Ipswitch. In 2019 Ipswitch itself (and thus iMacros along with it) was acquired by Progress. In November 2022 Progress discontinued iMacros. In 2020 Mathias Roth started the Ui.Vision RPA project, an open-source iMacros alternative with a focus on visual automation.

== Features ==
iMacros for Firefox and Chrome offered a feature known as social scripting, which allowed users to share macros and scripts in a manner similar to social bookmarking. Technically, these functions are distributed on web sites by embedding the imacro and the controlling JavaScript inside a plain text link.

Along with the freeware version, iMacros was available as a proprietary commercial application, with additional features and support for web scripting, web scraping, internet server monitoring, and web testing. In addition to working with HTML pages, the commercial editions could automate Adobe Flash, Adobe Flex, Silverlight, and Java applets by using Directscreen and image recognition technology. The freeware version of iMacros contained no control flow statements and, with a few minor exceptions, complex or conditional code required scripting available only in the commercial version.

Advanced versions also contained a command-line interface and an application programming interface (API) to automate more complicated tasks and integrate with other programs or scripts. The iMacros API was called the Scripting Interface. The Scripting Interface of the iMacros Scripting Edition was designed as a Component Object Model (COM) object and allowed the user to remotely control (script) the iMacros Browser, Internet Explorer, Firefox and Chrome from any Windows programming or scripting language.

== See also ==
- Jaxer
- Greasemonkey
- Selenium
- List of augmented browsing software
- List of Firefox extensions
