= Automator (macOS) =

macOS automation software

- Automator 2.10 on macOS Ventura
- Developer: Apple
- Release: April 29, 2005
- Stable release: 2.10 / December 2, 2022; 3 years ago
- Operating system: macOS
- Type: Automation
- License: Proprietary
- Website: support.apple.com/guide/automator/welcome/mac

Automator is an application developed by Apple for macOS, which can be used to automate repetitive tasks through point-and-click or drag and drop.

Automator enables the repetition of tasks across a wide variety of programs, including Finder, Safari, Calendar, Contacts and others. It can also work with third-party applications including Microsoft Office and Adobe Photoshop. Automator was first released with Mac OS X Tiger (10.4).

As of the release of macOS Monterey, Apple has encouraged users to transition from Automator to Shortcuts, and has allowed for almost any Automator shortcut to be imported into the Shortcuts app. Recent development changes have also favored Shortcuts over Automator, although Automator has continued to be fully supported.

== Features ==
Automator documents are called workflows, and are made up of actions. Workflows are run sequentially, with each action being given the previous action's output, which it can then process or act upon. Variables can be specified, which can be modified or processed by subsequent actions. Workflows can also incorporate loops and variables. Automator comes with a library of actions (file renaming, finding linked images, creating a new mail message, etc.). Actions can also run custom scripts, including AppleScript, JavaScript, or shell scripts. Workflow documents can be run directly in Automator or saved as applications that run the workflow when launched. Workflows can also be added to the contextual menu, to process any selected text or file.

As of 2015, Microsoft has bundled Automator actions with Microsoft Office, which can be used to automate Outlook, Word, Excel, or PowerPoint.

The following is a non-exhaustive list of Automator's features:

- General
  - Simulate the pressing of any key on the keyboard at specified intervals
  - Run AppleScript, JavaScript, Python, Ruby scripts, or shell scripts
  - Create Folder Actions, a Finder feature that applies certain workflows to all files in a folder
  - Create Services, which can be started in the Services menu
  - Automator can integrate with Calendar, to launch workflows at a Calendar event's specified time and date (and the event can be set to repeat automatically)
  - Automator can also launch workflows with programmable voice commands (called Dictation Commands, added in OS X Yosemite)
- Internet
  - Download webpages as PDF
  - Extract an RSS feed from a given URL, and extract article text contents from that feed
  - Compose new emails, with specified subject line and attachments (which can be an output from a previous Action)
  - Upload files to FTP servers
- Multimedia
  - Control USB-connected cameras to take pictures at regular intervals
  - Perform Finder actions on images, including rotation, applying Quartz filters (like black & white), and converting audio and video files to different formats
  - Batch resize photos
  - Import audio files to iTunes, and add them to playlists
  - Play an iTunes playlist
- Text and documents
  - Turn text files to audio files, using the Mac's built-in text-to-speech feature
  - Extract text from PDF files
  - Combine PDF documents
  - Extract annotations from PDFs
  - Move files across folders, into folders, or out of subfolders
  - Process strings text, including adding quotations around text or outputting word count
  - Print files; and when combined with the "Get Folder Contents" action, it can print all files in a "drop box" folder

== Interface ==
Automator provides a graphical user interface for automating tasks without knowledge of programming or scripting languages. Tasks can be recorded as they are performed by the user or can be selected from a list. The output of the previous action can become the input to the next action.

The icon for Automator features a robot, known as Otto the Automator.

== History ==
Starting in macOS Monterey, Automator exists alongside Shortcuts.

== See also ==
- AppleScript – Scripting language for macOS
- AutoHotkey – Automation-focused scripting language for Windows
