= Email bankruptcy =

Communication management method

Email bankruptcy is deleting or ignoring all emails older than a certain date, due to an overwhelming volume of messages. The term is usually attributed to author Lawrence Lessig in 2004, though it can also be attributed to Sherry Turkle in 2002. An insurmountable volume or backlog of legitimate messages (e.g. on return from an extended absence) usually leads to bankruptcy.

During the act of declaring email bankruptcy, a message is usually sent to all senders explaining the problem, that their message has been deleted, and that if their message still requires a response they should resend their message.

Similarly, the inability to maintain an overview over messages in an instant messenger chat room may be referred to as chat room bankruptcy.
