= Sherry Turkle =

American social scientist and psychologist (born 1948)

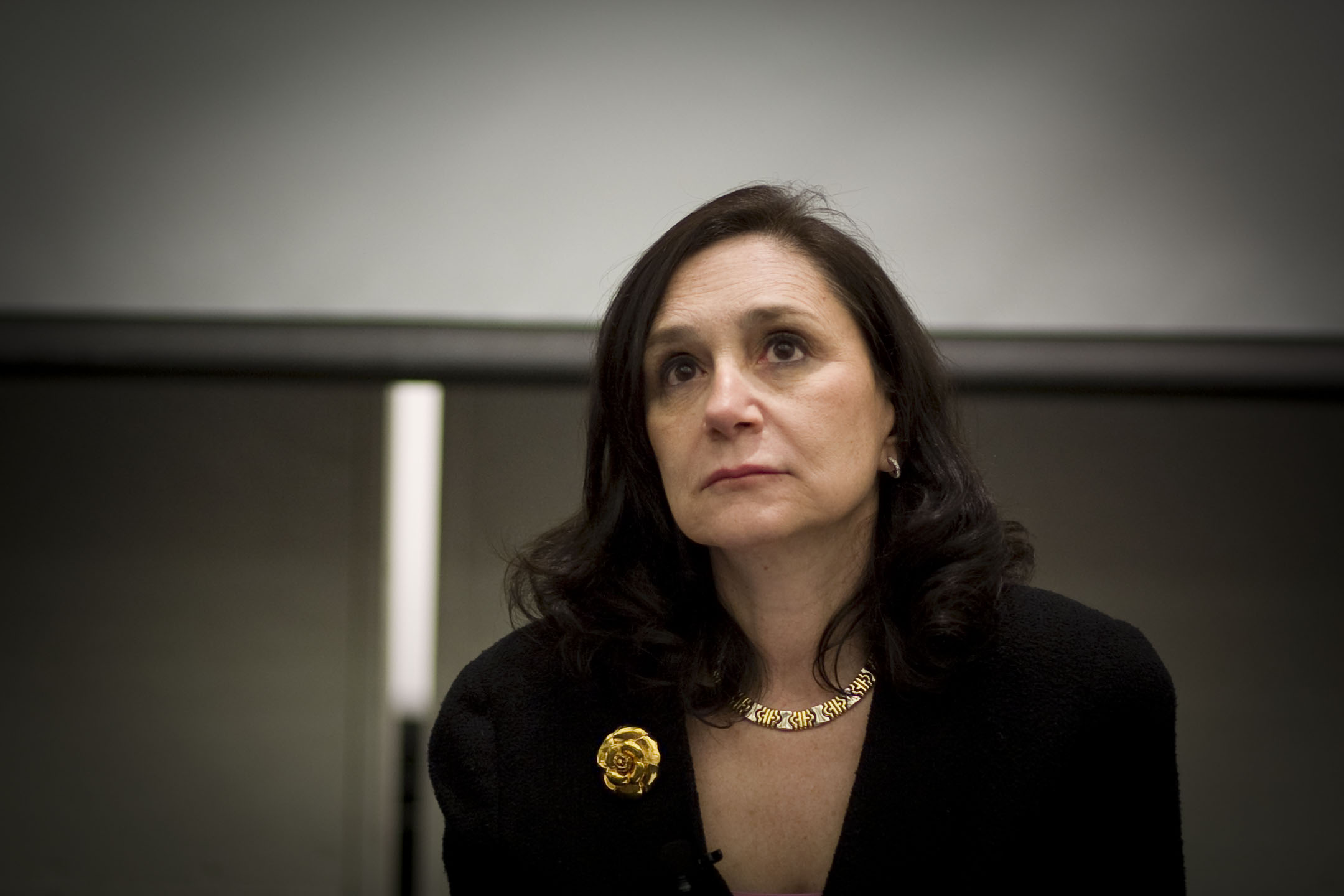
- Turkle in 2009
- Born: June 18, 1948 (age 78); New York City, New York, U.S.
- Education: PhD in sociology and personality psychology BA in social studies
- Known for: Social Studies of Science and Technology
- Notable work: The Second Self: Computers and the Human Spirit, Alone Together: Why We Expect More from Technology and Less from Each Other
- Spouses: Seymour Papert (m. 1977; div. 1985); Ralph Willard (m. 1987; div. 1998)
- Website: sherryturkle.com

Sherry Turkle (born June 18, 1948) is an American sociologist. She is the Abby Rockefeller Mauzé Professor of the Social Studies of Science and Technology at the Massachusetts Institute of Technology. She obtained a BA in social studies and later a PhD in sociology and personality psychology at Harvard University. She now focuses her research on psychoanalysis and human-technology interaction. She has written several books focusing on the psychology of human relationships with technology, especially in the realm of how people relate to computational objects. Her memoir 'Empathy Diaries' received excellent critical reviews.

== Writings ==
In The Second Self, she writes about how computers are not tools as much as they are a part of our social and psychological lives, writing that technology "catalyzes changes not only in what we do but in how we think." She goes on using Jean Piaget's psychology discourse to discuss how children learn about computers and how this affects their minds. The Second Self was received well by critics and was praised for being "a very thorough and ambitious study."

In Life on the Screen, Turkle discusses how emerging technology, specifically computers, affect the way we think and see ourselves as humans. She presents to us the different ways in which computers affect us, and how it has led us to the now prevalent use of "cyberspace." Turkle suggests that assuming different personal identities in a MUD (i.e. computer fantasy game) may be therapeutic. She also considers the problems that arise when using MUDs. Turkle discusses what she calls women's "non-linear" approach to the technology, calling it "soft mastery" and "bricolage" (as opposed to the "hard mastery" of linear, abstract thinking and computer programming). She discusses problems that arise when children pose as adults online.

Turkle also explores the psychological and societal impact of such "relational artifacts" as social robots, and how these and other technologies are changing attitudes about human life and living things generally. One result may be a devaluation of authentic experience in a relationship. Together with Seymour Papert she wrote the influential paper "Epistemological Pluralism and the Revaluation of the Concrete." Turkle has written numerous articles on psychoanalysis and culture and on the "subjective side" of people's relationships with technology, especially computers. She is engaged in active study of robots, digital pets, and simulated creatures, particularly those designed for children and the elderly as well as in a study of mobile cellular technologies. Profiles of Turkle have appeared in such publications as The New York Times, Scientific American, and Wired Magazine. She is a featured media commentator on the effects of technology for CNN, NBC, ABC, and NPR, including appearances on such programs as Nightline and 20/20.

Turkle has begun to assess the adverse effects of rapidly advancing technology on human social behavior. Alone Together: Why We Expect More from Technology and Less from Each Other was published in 2011 and when discussing the topic she speaks about the need to limit the use of popular technological devices because of these adverse effects.

== Early life and education ==
Sherry Turkle was born in Brooklyn on June 18, 1948. After she graduated as a valedictorian from Abraham Lincoln High School in 1965, she began her studies at Radcliffe College, graduating in 1969 with a bachelor's degree in Social Studies. She then obtained a master's degree in sociology in 1973 and a doctorate in Sociology and Personality Psychology in 1976, both from Harvard University. Inspired by her time in France during her undergraduate years, she did her dissertation research in France, "writing about the relationship between Freudian thought and the modern French revolutionary movements." This relationship was also the subject of her first book, Psychoanalytic Politics: Jacques Lacan and Freud's French Revolution. Turkle has been married twice, first to MIT researcher Seymour Papert, and then to consultant Ralph Willard. Both marriages ended in divorce.

== The Second Self ==
In The Second Self (1984), Turkle defines the computer as more than just a tool, but part of our everyday personal and psychological lives. She looks at how computers affect the way we look at ourselves and our relationships with others, claiming that technology defines the way we think and act. Turkle's book allows us to view and reevaluate our own relationships with technology.

In her process of evaluating our relationships with computers, Turkle interviews children, college students, engineers, AI scientists, hackers and personal computer owners in order to further understand our relationships with computers and how we interact with them on a personal level. The interviews showed that computers are both a part of our selves as well as part of the external world. In this book, Turkle tries to figure out why we think of computers in such psychological terms, how this happens and what this means for all of us.

== Life on the Screen ==
Turkle published the book Life on the Screen in 1995 about the rising use of the computer and its effect on how users think and see themselves. Originally intended as a tool to write and communicate, the computer gave rise to virtual worlds in which users enter and interact, a behavior which may cause users to have a more collective sense of identity. Turkle argued that the distinction between humans and computers had faded as computers became more and more human-like. Previously, people saw themselves as separate from machines due to machines' lack of emotion, but later began to compare the human mind to machines and talk to computers freely, without shame. Turkle questioned the ethics of differentiating between real life and simulated life.

== Alone Together ==
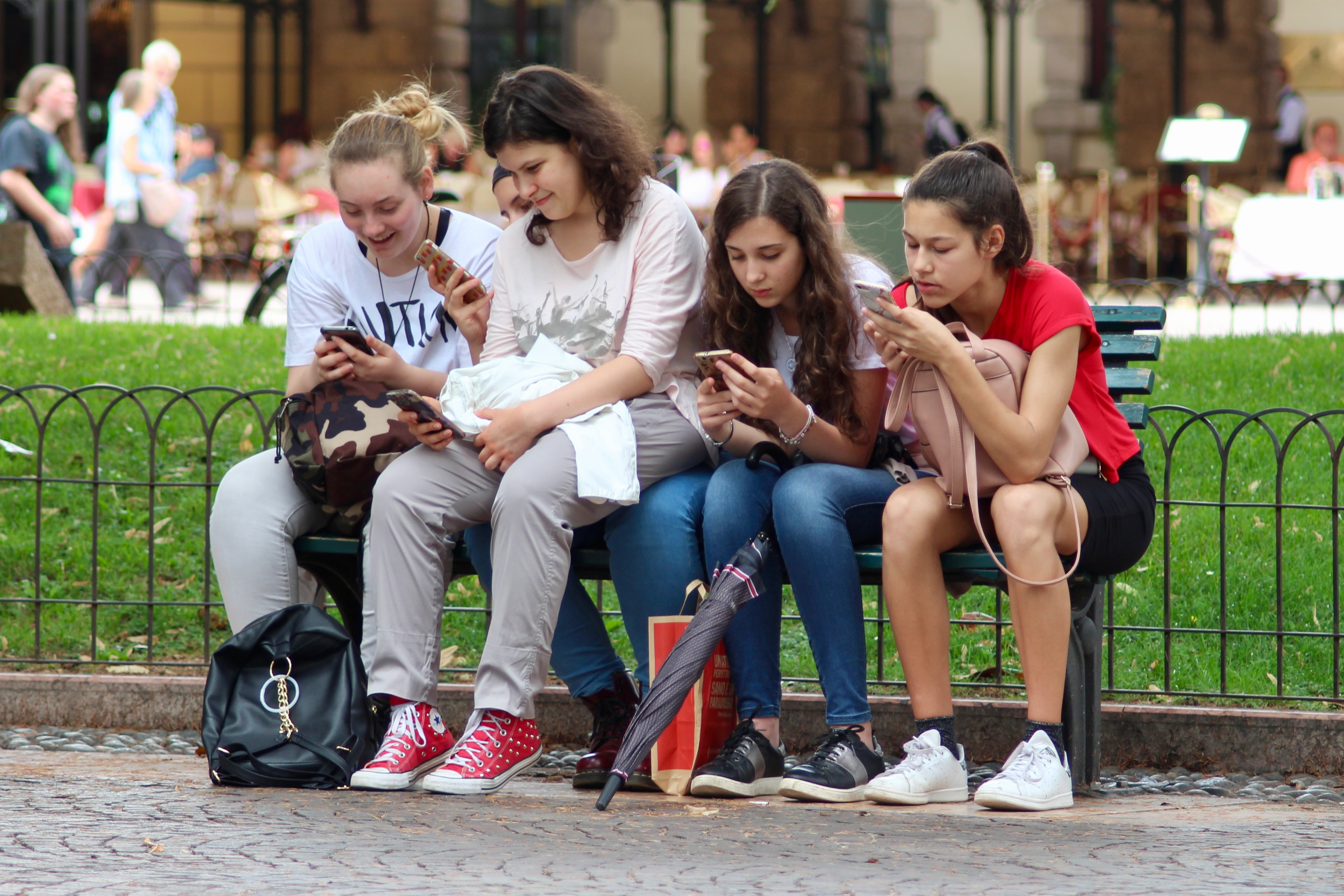
Alone Together explores how technology is changing the way we interact

In Alone Together (2011), Turkle explores how technology is changing the way we communicate. In particular, Turkle raises concerns about the way in which genuine, organic social interactions become degraded through constant exposure to illusory meaningful exchanges with artificial intelligence. Underlying Turkle's central argument is the fact that the technological developments which have most contributed to the rise of inter-connectivity have at the same time bolstered a sense of alienation between people. The alienation involves links between social networks favouring those of proper conversations.

Turkle's main argument in the first part of the book is that our interactions with robots that simulate emotion pose serious threats to our ability to relate to one another properly. Turkle discusses robots that have been designed to interact with humans on an emotional level; she fears that they may then replace other humans and animals in these emotional roles. Turkle is concerned that we often attribute certain qualities to robots that the robots do not in fact possess, and that our emotional interactions with other humans become eroded as a direct result. Turkle's concern is that our appreciation for human interaction may become eroded.

The second part of the book examines the nature of online social interactions, and the way in which social media has changed how people, particularly younger people, connect with one another. Turkle argues that because people in interpersonal social situations, particularly young people, are often distracted by their phones, they will pay insufficient attention to one another, creating increasingly shallow relationships. Turkle argues that teenagers' reliance on friends' advice prevents self-reflection, leading to less personal independence.

Turkle talks about the nature of privacy in the post 9/11 world, arguing that privacy was sacrificed in exchange for safety. Turkle argues that because they have grown up as part of a world in which privacy is regarded as increasingly tenuous, children do not always appreciate the full value of privacy, which in turn causes them to share even more personal details on the web. This further depreciates the value of privacy in a self-perpetuating cycle.

Using her 15 year of experience, Turkle uses Alone Together to explore the question of whether or not technology is bringing quality to our lives. Turkle argues people use technology to escape from reality and emotions, which weakens genuine relationships.

In 2011, Turkle was interviewed by Stephen Colbert on The Colbert Report, where she spoke briefly about Alone Together, and the impact that technology has on communication skills.

Turkle gave a TED talk on the subject of Alone Together in February 2012, under the title "Connected, but alone?"

== Reclaiming Conversation ==
Reclaiming Conversation and The Power of Talk in A Digital Age (2015) is Turkle's examination of evolving interpersonal and intrapersonal communications,. In the preamble, Turkle cites Henry David Thoreau's Walden as providing guidance for the structure of the book: "I had three chairs in my house; one for solitude, two for friendship, three for society." This book is thus divided into three general parts: a single chair for intrapersonal communication, two chairs concerning the importance of conversations in friendships, families and romances, and three chairs for interpersonal communication such as in school, work, and politics. Turkle gathered data from schools, companies, families, and articulates the statistical and psychoanalytic barriers that have forced users to "sacrifice conversation for mere connection". This trade-off in interwoven intimacies and apps ultimately withholds the necessary "face-to-face experiences that are needed for generating authentic connection".

The capacity to interact on a personal or private basis is the cornerstone to empathy, and Turkle argues that loneliness is also essential to this. Paradoxically, Turkle presents the blossoming of technologies role in our reconciliation of lonely experiences and maintaining close social interactions. While access to mobile devices can empower connections with pre-existing relationships, it can also harm the general sense of solitude and ability to meet personal and social standards on a grander scale. The ability to connect through technology then becomes the compromise that chatting online is "better than nothing".

Turkle gave a talk for Google about her book Reclaiming Conversation.

Aziz Ansari responded to Reclaiming Conversation by saying, "In a time in which the ways we communicate and connect are constantly changing, and not always for the better, Sherry Turkle provides a much needed voice of caution and reason to help explain what the f*** is going on."

== Books ==
- Psychoanalytic Politics: Jacques Lacan and Freud's French Revolution (1978) ISBN 0-89862-474-6
- The Second Self: Computers and the Human Spirit (1984). ISBN 0-262-70111-1
- Life on the Screen: Identity in the Age of the Internet (1995) (paperback ISBN 0-684-83348-4)
- Evocative Objects: Things We Think With, (Ed.), MIT Press (2007). ISBN 0-262-20168-2
- Falling for Science: Objects in Mind, (Ed.), MIT Press (2008). ISBN 978-0-262-20172-8
- The Inner History of Devices, (Ed.), MIT Press (2008). ISBN 978-0-262-20176-6
- Simulation and Its Discontents, MIT Press (2009). ISBN 978-0-262-01270-6
- Alone Together, Basic Books (2011). ISBN 978-0-465-01021-9
- Reclaiming Conversation: The Power of Talk in a Digital Age, Penguin Press (2015). ISBN 978-1-594-20555-2
- The Empathy Diaries: A Memoir, Penguin Press (2021). ISBN 978-0-525-56009-8
- Artificial Intimacy: Who We Become When We Talk to Machines, Little, Brown and Company (2026). ISBN 978-0-316-57396-2

== Papers and reports ==
- Sherry Turkle, Will Taggart, Cory D. Kidd, and Olivia Dasté. (December 2006). "Relational Artifacts with Children and Elders: The Complexities of Cybercompanionship," Connection Science, 18(4):347–361.
- Sherry Turkle, (July 2006). "A Nascent Robotics Culture: New Complicities for Companionship," AAAI Technical Report Series.
- Turkle, Sherry (January 1, 1996). "Who Am We? : We are moving from modernist calculation toward postmodernist simulation, where the self is a multiple, distributed system". Wired. No. 4.01.

== Interviews ==
- Liz Else, Sherry Turkle. "Living online: I'll have to ask my friends", New Scientist, issue 2569, 20 September 2006. (interview; subscription needed for full article)
- Colbert Report, Jan. 17th, 2011.
- Fischetti, M. (2014). "The Networked Primate". Scientific American, 311 (3). 82–85.
- Roberts, Russ (March 15, 2021). "Sherry Turkle on Family, Artificial Intelligence, and the Empathy Diaries". EconTalk (Podcast).

== Awards and honors ==
Turkle is a recipient of a Guggenheim Fellowship, a Rockefeller Humanities Fellowship, the Harvard Centennial Medal, and is a member of the American Academy of Arts and Sciences.

In May 2015, Turkle received an Honorary Degree, Doctor of Science, from Franklin & Marshall College.

In June 2016, Turkle received an honorary doctorate degree from Concordia University.

In 2018 she was featured among "America's Top 50 Women In Tech" by Forbes.

== Personal life ==
She was married to Seymour Papert from 1977 to 1985 and Ralph Willard from 1987 to 1998.
