= Androula Henriques =

Cypriot activist (born 1936)

- Ανδρούλα Χριστοφίδου Ενρίκες
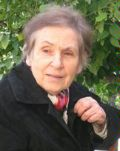
- Henriques in 2010
- Born: Androula Christofidou Henriques; 1936 (age 89–90); Nicosia, British Cyprus

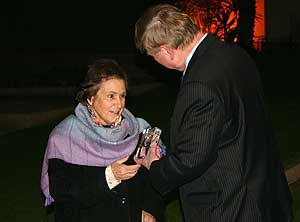
Receiving an award in 2010

Androula Christofidou Henriques (Greek: Ανδρούλα Χριστοφίδου Ενρίκες; born 1936) is a Cypriot activist who campaigns against human trafficking.

== Life ==
Androula was born in Nicosia in 1936. She studied in child psychology in Geneva and worked under Jean Piaget in the University of Geneva. She wrote three books on the theories of Jean Piaget in pedagogy.

== Activism ==
She created her own anti-human trafficking network, Cyprus Stop Trafficking. She was the president of the organization from 2012 until she resigned in 2018. She also lobbied the government of Cyprus to stop human trafficking. Her network organized an anti-trafficking conference in Cyprus in 2008 which included speakers from the United States and the EU, as well as representatives of the Police, the House of Representatives, the Attorney General's Office, the Turkish-Cypriot community, several NGOs, and many journalists. She has also helped trafficked women by letting them stay in her home as they prepared to testify in court against those who held them as sex slaves. She has published five books on human trafficking. Additionally, she also founded in Geneva, ACEES (L’Association Contre L’ Exploitation et L’ Esclavage Sexuel).

== Personal life ==
Androula is married to a Portuguese man and has two children. She spends her life between Switzerland and Cyprus.

== Awards and recognition ==
She received a 2010 International Women of Courage award. In 2012 she was appointed to the rank of Commander in the National Order of Merit by France's Ambassador to Cyprus, Jean-Luc Florent.

== Publications ==
- Henriques, A. (1990). Experiments in teaching. In: Duckworth, E., Easley, J., Hawkins, D. and Henriques, A. (eds.). Science education: A mind's-on approach for the elementary years. Hillsdale, New Jersey: Lawrence Erlbaum Associates,141–186.
