= Artificial intelligence =

Intelligence in machines

Artificial intelligence (AI) is the capability of computational systems to perform tasks typically associated with human intelligence, such as learning, reasoning, problem-solving, perception, and decision-making. It is also a field of research spanning computer science, engineering, and mathematics that develops and studies methods and software enabling machines to perceive their environment and use learning and intelligence to take actions that maximize their chances of achieving defined goals.

Prominent applications of AI include advanced web search engines, chatbots, virtual assistants, autonomous vehicles, play and analysis in strategy games (e.g., chess and Go), and content generation (e.g., text, images, audio, and videos).

The traditional goals of AI research include learning, reasoning, knowledge representation, planning, natural language processing, and perception, as well as support for robotics. (Note: This list of intelligent traits is based on the topics covered by the major AI textbooks, including: Russell & Norvig (2021), Luger & Stubblefield (2004), Poole, Mackworth & Goebel (1998) and Nilsson (1998).) To reach these goals, AI researchers use techniques including state space search and mathematical optimization, formal logic, artificial neural networks, and methods based on statistics, operations research, and economics. (Note: This list of tools is based on the topics covered by the major AI textbooks, including: Russell & Norvig (2021), Luger & Stubblefield (2004), Poole, Mackworth & Goebel (1998) and Nilsson (1998).) AI also draws upon psychology, linguistics, philosophy, neuroscience, and other fields. Some companies, such as OpenAI, Google DeepMind, and Meta, aim to create artificial general intelligence (AGI)—AI that can complete nearly any cognitive task at least as well as a human.

Artificial intelligence was founded as an academic discipline in 1956. The field went through multiple cycles of optimism throughout its history, alternating with periods of disappointment and loss of funding known as AI winters. Funding and interest increased substantially after 2012, when graphics processing units (GPUs) started being used to accelerate neural networks, and deep learning outperformed previous AI techniques. This growth accelerated further after 2017 with transformer architecture. The 2020s AI boom was spurred on largely by advances in generative AI, which can create and modify media. In addition to AI safety and unintended consequences and harms from the use of AI, ethical concerns, AI's long-term effects, environmental effects, and potential existential risks have prompted discussions of AI regulation.

== Goals ==
The general problem of simulating (or creating) intelligence has been broken down into subproblems. These consist of specific traits or capabilities that researchers expect an intelligent system to display. The traits described below have received the most attention and cover the scope of AI research.

=== Reasoning and problem-solving ===
Early researchers developed algorithms that imitated step-by-step reasoning that humans use when solving puzzles or making logical deductions. By the late 1980s and 1990s, methods were developed for dealing with uncertain or incomplete information, employing concepts from probability and economics.

Many of these algorithms were insufficient for solving large reasoning problems because they experienced a 'combinatorial explosion', meaning they become exponentially slower as the problems grow. Even humans rarely use the step-by-step deduction that early AI research could model. Humans solve most of their problems using fast, intuitive judgments.

Reasoning models, a type of large language model (LLM) trained to generate intermediate chains of thought, emerged in 2024, and allowed improved performance on complex problems in mathematics and coding. These models can produce incorrect outputs or 'hallucinations', unlike symbolic reasoning systems.

=== Knowledge representation ===
An ontology represents knowledge as a set of concepts within a domain and the relationships between those concepts.

AI programs use knowledge to answer questions intelligently and make deductions about real-world facts.

Formal knowledge representation and knowledge engineering use symbols to represent words, concepts, and things in the world. (Note: Formal knowledge representations are used in content-based indexing and retrieval, scene interpretation, clinical decision support, knowledge discovery (mining "interesting" and actionable inferences from large databases), and other areas.) A knowledge base is a body of knowledge represented in a form that can be used by a program. An ontology is a set of objects, relations, concepts, and properties used by a particular domain of knowledge. Formal knowledge has been studied extensively since the 1970s, and researchers have developed formalisms for a wide variety of difficult domains. (Note: A complete formal knowledge base needs to represent things such as objects, properties, categories, and relations between objects; situations, events, states, and time; causes and effects; knowledge about knowledge (what we know about what other people know); default reasoning (things humans assume are true until they are told differently and will remain true even when other facts are changing); and many other aspects and domains of knowledge.)

The symbolic approach has difficulty with several problems: the breadth of commonsense knowledge (the set of atomic facts the average person knows is enormous), the sub-symbolic form of most commonsense knowledge (much of what people know is not represented as facts or statements that they can express verbally), and knowledge acquisition (the problem of obtaining knowledge for AI applications). (Note: Knowledge acquistion is among the reasons that expert systems proved to be inefficient for capturing knowledge.)

Large language models (and some other AI programs developed since 2012) do not require explicit, symbolic knowledge. They acquire knowledge by being trained on the combined text of millions of books and billions of websites. Modern AI can also learn about a domain by running experiments (as when AlphaZero learns game strategy by playing against itself). Machine learning solves the problems of general knowledge, commonsense knowledge, and knowledge acquisition, but this approach has struggled with accurate recall and valid reasoning.

=== Planning and decision-making ===
An 'agent' is any entity (artificial or not) that perceives and takes actions in the world. A rational agent has goals or preferences and takes actions to make them happen. (Note: "Rational agent" is general term used in economics, philosophy and theoretical artificial intelligence. It can refer to anything that directs its behaviour to accomplish goals, such as a person, an animal, a corporation, a nation, or in the case of AI, a computer program.) In automated planning, the agent has a specific goal. In automated decision-making, the agent has preferences—there are some situations it would prefer to be in and some situations it is trying to avoid. The decision-making agent assigns a number to each situation (called its 'utility') that measures how much the agent prefers it. For each possible action, it can calculate the'expected utility': the utility of all possible outcomes of the action weighted by the probability that the outcome will occur. It can then choose the action with the maximum expected utility.

In classical planning, the agent knows what the effect of any action will be. In most real-world problems, however, the agent might not understand its current situation with certainty as it is unknown or unobservable, nor might it know for certain what will happen after each possible action as it is not deterministic. It must choose an action by making a probabilistic guess and then reassess the situation to see if the action had the desired effect.

Alongside thorough testing and improvement based on previous decisions, having an explanation for why the agent took certain decisions is a way to build trust, especially when the decisions have to be relied upon.

In some problems, the agent's preferences may be uncertain, especially if there are other agents or humans involved. These preferences may be learned (e.g., with inverse reinforcement learning), or the agent can seek information to improve them. Information value theory can be used to weigh the value of exploratory or experimental actions. The space of possible future actions and situations is typically intractably large, so the agents must take actions and evaluate situations while being uncertain of the outcome.

A Markov decision process has a transition model that describes the probability that a particular action will change the state in a particular way and a reward function that supplies the utility of each state and the cost of each action. A policy associates a decision with each possible state. The policy could be calculated, e.g., by policy iteration, or determined by a heuristic or learned.

Game theory describes the rational behavior of multiple interacting agents and is used in AI programs that make decisions involving other agents.

=== Learning ===
Machine learning is the study of programs that can improve their performance on a given task automatically. It has been a part of AI from the beginning. (Note: Alan Turing discussed the centrality of learning as early as 1950, in his classic paper "Computing Machinery and Intelligence". In 1956, at the original Dartmouth AI summer conference, Ray Solomonoff wrote a report on unsupervised probabilistic machine learning: "An Inductive Inference Machine".)

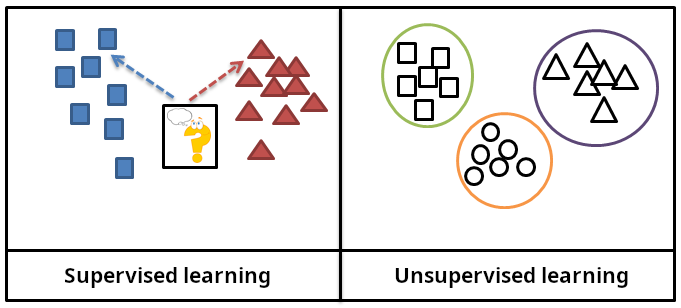
In supervised learning, the training data is labelled with the expected answers, while in unsupervised learning, the model identifies patterns or structures in unlabelled data.

There are several kinds of machine learning:

- Unsupervised learning analyses a stream of data, finds patterns, and makes predictions without any other guidance.
- Supervised learning requires labelling the training data with the expected answers, and comes in two main varieties: classification (where the program must learn to predict what category the input belongs in) and regression (where the program must deduce a numeric function based on numeric input).
- Reinforcement learning is when the agent is rewarded for good responses and punished for bad ones. The agent learns to choose responses that are classified as "good".
- Transfer learning is when the knowledge gained from one problem is applied to a new problem.
- Deep learning is a type of machine learning that runs inputs through biologically inspired artificial neural networks for all of these types of learning.

Computational learning theory can assess learners by computational complexity, sample complexity (how much data is required), or other notions of optimisation.

=== Natural language processing ===
Natural language processing (NLP) allows programs to read, write, and communicate in human languages. Specific problems include speech recognition, speech synthesis, machine translation, information extraction, information retrieval, and question answering.

Early work, based on Noam Chomsky's generative grammar and semantic networks, had difficulty with word-sense disambiguation (Note: See AI winter § Machine translation and the ALPAC report of 1966.) unless restricted to small domains called "micro-worlds" (due to the common sense knowledge problem). British linguist and philosopher Margaret Masterman believed it was meaning and not grammar that was the key to understanding languages, and that dictionaries and especially thesauri should be the basis of computational language structure.

Modern deep learning techniques for NLP include word embedding (representing words, typically as vectors encoding their meaning), transformers (a deep learning architecture using an attention mechanism), and others. In 2019, generative pre-trained transformer (or "GPT") language models began to generate coherent text. By 2023, these models were able to get human-level scores on the bar exam, SAT (Scholastic Assessment Test), GRE (Graduate Record Examination), and many other real-world applications.

=== Perception ===
Machine perception is the ability to use input from sensors (such as cameras, microphones, wireless signals, active lidar, sonar, radar, and tactile sensors) to deduce aspects of the world. Computer vision is the ability to analyse visual input.

The field includes speech recognition, image classification, facial recognition, object recognition, object tracking, and robotic perception.

=== Social intelligence ===
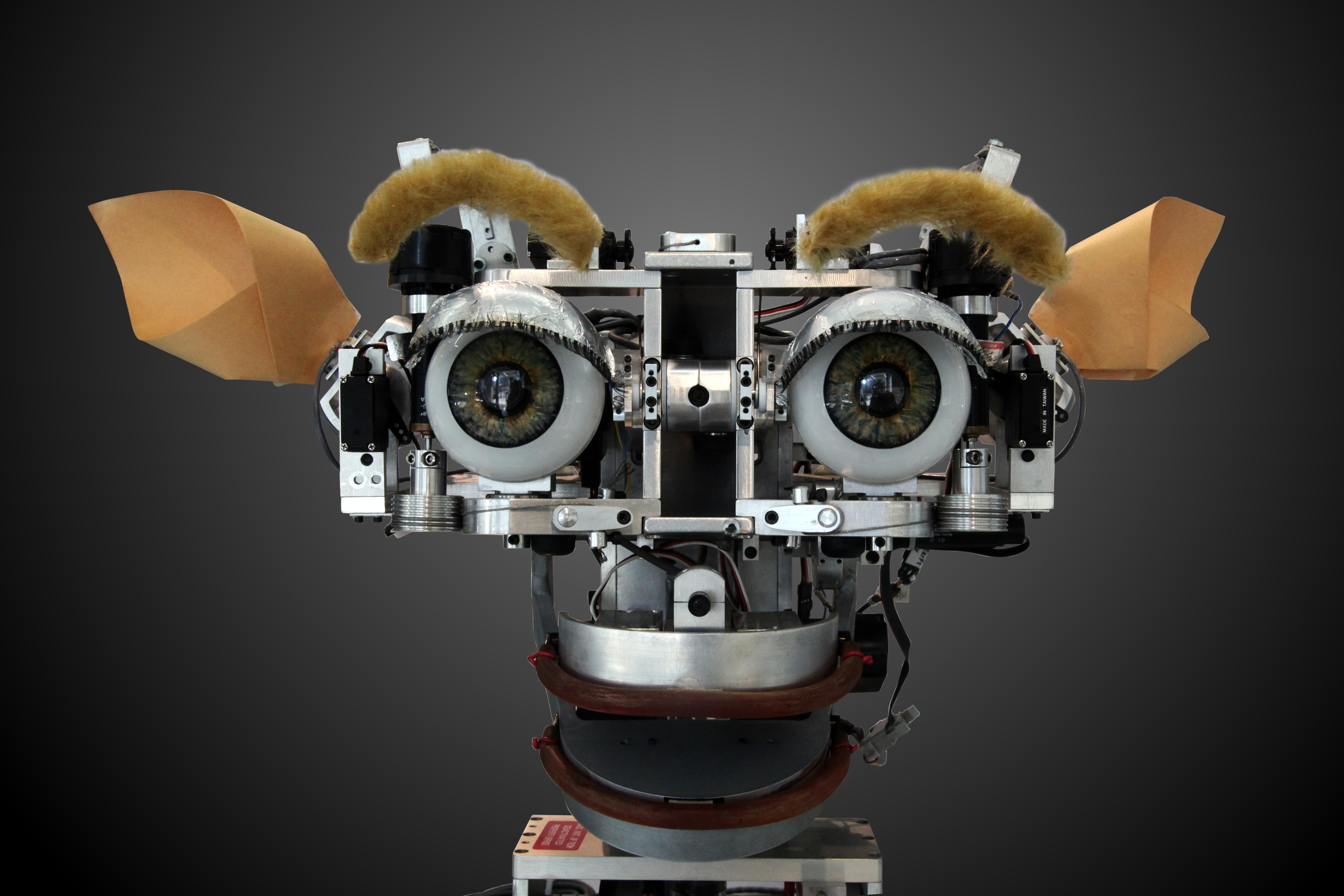
Kismet, a robot head made in the 1990s, is a machine that can recognise and simulate emotions.

Affective computing is a field that comprises systems that recognise, interpret, process, or simulate human affect (feeling, emotion, and mood). For example, some virtual assistants are programmed to speak conversationally or even banter humorously; it makes them appear more sensitive to the emotional dynamics of human interaction, or to otherwise facilitate human–computer interaction.

However, this tends to give naïve users an unrealistic conception of the intelligence of existing computer agents. Moderate successes related to affective computing include textual sentiment analysis and, more recently, multimodal sentiment analysis, wherein AI classifies the effects displayed by a videotaped subject.

=== General intelligence ===
A machine with artificial general intelligence (AGI) would be able to solve a wide variety of problems with breadth and versatility similar to human intelligence.

== Techniques ==
AI research uses a wide variety of techniques to accomplish the goals above.

=== Search and optimisation ===
There are two different kinds of search used in AI: state space search and local search:

==== State space search ====
State space search searches through a tree of possible states to try to find a goal state. For example, planning algorithms search through trees of goals and subgoals, attempting to find a path to a target goal, a process called means-ends analysis.

Simple exhaustive searches are rarely sufficient for most real-world problems: the search space (the number of places to search) quickly grows to impractically large numbers. The result is a search that is too slow or never completes. "Heuristics" or "rules of thumb" can help prioritise choices that are more likely to reach a goal.

Adversarial search is used for game-playing programs, such as chess or Go. It searches through a tree of possible moves and countermoves, looking for a winning position.

==== Local search ====
Illustration of gradient descent for three different starting points; two parameters (represented by the plan coordinates) are adjusted in order to minimise the loss function (the height).

Local search uses mathematical optimisation to find a solution to a problem. It begins with some form of guess and refines it incrementally.

Gradient descent is a type of local search that optimises a set of numerical parameters by incrementally adjusting them to minimise a loss function. Variants of gradient descent are commonly used to train neural networks, through the backpropagation algorithm.

Another type of local search is evolutionary computation, which aims to iteratively improve a set of candidate solutions by "mutating" and "recombining" them, selecting only the fittest to survive each generation.

Distributed search processes can coordinate via swarm intelligence algorithms. Two popular swarm algorithms used in search are particle swarm optimisation (inspired by bird flocking) and ant colony optimisation (inspired by ant trails).

=== Logic ===
Formal logic is used for reasoning and knowledge representation. Formal logic comes in two main forms: propositional logic (which operates on statements that are true or false and uses logical connectives such as "and", "or", "not" and "implies") and predicate logic (which also operates on objects, predicates and relations and uses quantifiers such as "Every X is a Y" and "There are some Xs that are Ys").

Deductive reasoning in logic is the process of proving a new statement (conclusion) from other statements that are given and assumed to be true (the premises). Proofs can be structured as proof trees, in which nodes are labelled by sentences, and children nodes are connected to parent nodes by inference rules.

Given a problem and a set of premises, problem-solving reduces to searching for a proof tree whose root node is labelled by a solution of the problem and whose leaf nodes are labelled by premises or axioms. In the case of Horn clauses, problem-solving search can be performed by reasoning forwards from the premises or backwards from the problem. In the more general case of the clausal form of first-order logic, resolution is a single, axiom-free rule of inference, in which a problem is solved by proving a contradiction from premises that include the negation of the problem to be solved.

Inference in both Horn clause logic and first-order logic is undecidable, and therefore intractable. However, backward reasoning with Horn clauses, which underpins computation in the logic programming language Prolog, is Turing complete. Moreover, its efficiency is competitive with computation in other symbolic programming languages.

Fuzzy logic assigns a "degree of truth" between 0 and 1. It can therefore handle propositions that are vague and partially true.

Non-monotonic logics, including logic programming with negation as failure, are designed to handle default reasoning. Other specialised versions of logic have been developed to describe many complex domains.

=== Probabilistic methods for uncertain reasoning ===
A simple Bayesian network, with the associated conditional probability tables

Many problems in AI (including reasoning, planning, learning, perception, and robotics) require the agent to operate with incomplete or uncertain information. AI researchers have devised a number of tools to solve these problems using methods from probability theory and economics. Precise mathematical tools have been developed that analyse how an agent can make choices and plan, using decision theory, decision analysis, and information value theory. These tools include models such as Markov decision processes, dynamic decision networks, game theory, and mechanism design.

Bayesian networks are a tool that can be used for reasoning (using the Bayesian inference algorithm), (Note: Compared with symbolic logic, formal Bayesian inference is computationally expensive. For inference to be tractable, most observations must be conditionally independent of one another. AdSense uses a Bayesian network with over 300 million edges to learn which ads to serve.) learning (using the expectation–maximisation algorithm), (Note: Expectation–maximisation, one of the most popular algorithms in machine learning, allows clustering in the presence of unknown latent variables.) planning (using decision networks) and perception (using dynamic Bayesian networks).

Probabilistic algorithms can also be used for filtering, prediction, smoothing, and finding explanations for streams of data, thus helping perception systems analyse processes that occur over time (e.g., hidden Markov models or Kalman filters).

Expectation–maximisation clustering of Old Faithful eruption data starts from a random guess but then successfully converges on an accurate clustering of the two physically distinct modes of eruption.

=== Classifiers and statistical learning methods ===
The simplest AI applications can be divided into two types: classifiers (e.g., "if shiny then diamond"), on one hand, and controllers (e.g., "if diamond then pick up"), on the other hand. Classifiers are functions that use pattern matching to determine the closest match. They can be fine-tuned based on chosen examples using supervised learning. Each pattern (also called an "observation") is labeled with a certain predefined class. All the observations combined with their class labels are known as a data set. When a new observation is received, that observation is classified based on previous experience.

There are many kinds of classifiers in use. The decision tree is the simplest and most widely used symbolic machine learning algorithm. K-nearest neighbour algorithm was the most widely used analogical AI until the mid-1990s, and Kernel methods such as the support vector machine (SVM) displaced k-nearest neighbour in the 1990s. The naive Bayes classifier is reportedly the "most widely used learner" at Google, due in part to its scalability. Neural networks are also used as classifiers.

=== Artificial neural networks ===
A neural network is an interconnected group of nodes, akin to the vast network of neurons in the human brain.

An artificial neural network is based on a collection of nodes also known as artificial neurons, which loosely model the neurons in a biological brain. It is trained to recognise patterns; once trained, it can recognise those patterns in fresh data. There is an input, at least one hidden layer of nodes and an output. Each node applies a function and once the weight crosses its specified threshold, the data is transmitted to the next layer. A network is typically called a deep neural network if it has at least 2 hidden layers.

Learning algorithms for neural networks use local search to choose the weights that will get the right output for each input during training. The most common training technique is the backpropagation algorithm. Neural networks learn to model complex relationships between inputs and outputs and find patterns in data. In theory, a neural network can learn any function.

In feedforward neural networks the signal passes in only one direction. The term perceptron typically refers to a single-layer neural network. In contrast, deep learning uses many layers. Recurrent neural networks (RNNs) feed the output signal back into the input, which allows short-term memories of previous input events. Long short-term memory networks (LSTMs) are recurrent neural networks that better preserve long-term dependencies and are less sensitive to the vanishing gradient problem. Convolutional neural networks (CNNs) use layers of kernels to more efficiently process local patterns. This local processing is especially important in image processing, where the early CNN layers typically identify simple local patterns such as edges and curves, with subsequent layers detecting more complex patterns like textures, and eventually whole objects.

==== Deep learning ====
Deep learning is a subset of machine learning, which is itself a subset of artificial intelligence.

Deep learning uses several layers of neurons between the network's inputs and outputs. The multiple layers can progressively extract higher-level features from the raw input. For example, in image processing, lower layers may identify edges, while higher layers may identify the concepts relevant to a human such as digits, letters, or faces.

Deep learning improves the performance of computer vision, speech recognition, natural language processing, image classification and many other applications.

==== GPTs and LLMs ====
Generative pre-trained transformers (GPTs) are large language models (LLMs) that generate text based on the semantic relationships between words in sentences. Text-based GPT models are pre-trained on a large corpus of text that can be from the Internet. The pretraining consists of predicting the next token (a token being usually a word, subword, or punctuation). Throughout this pretraining, GPT models accumulate knowledge about the world and can then generate human-like text by repeatedly predicting the next token. Typically, a subsequent training phase makes the model more truthful, useful, and harmless, usually with a technique called reinforcement learning from human feedback (RLHF). Current GPT models are prone to generating falsehoods called "hallucinations". These can be reduced with RLHF and quality data, but the problem has been getting worse for reasoning systems. Such systems are used in chatbots, which allow people to ask a question or request a task in simple text.

Current models and services include ChatGPT, Claude, Gemini, Copilot, and Meta AI. Multimodal GPT models can process different types of data (modalities) such as images, videos, sound, and text.

=== Hardware and software ===
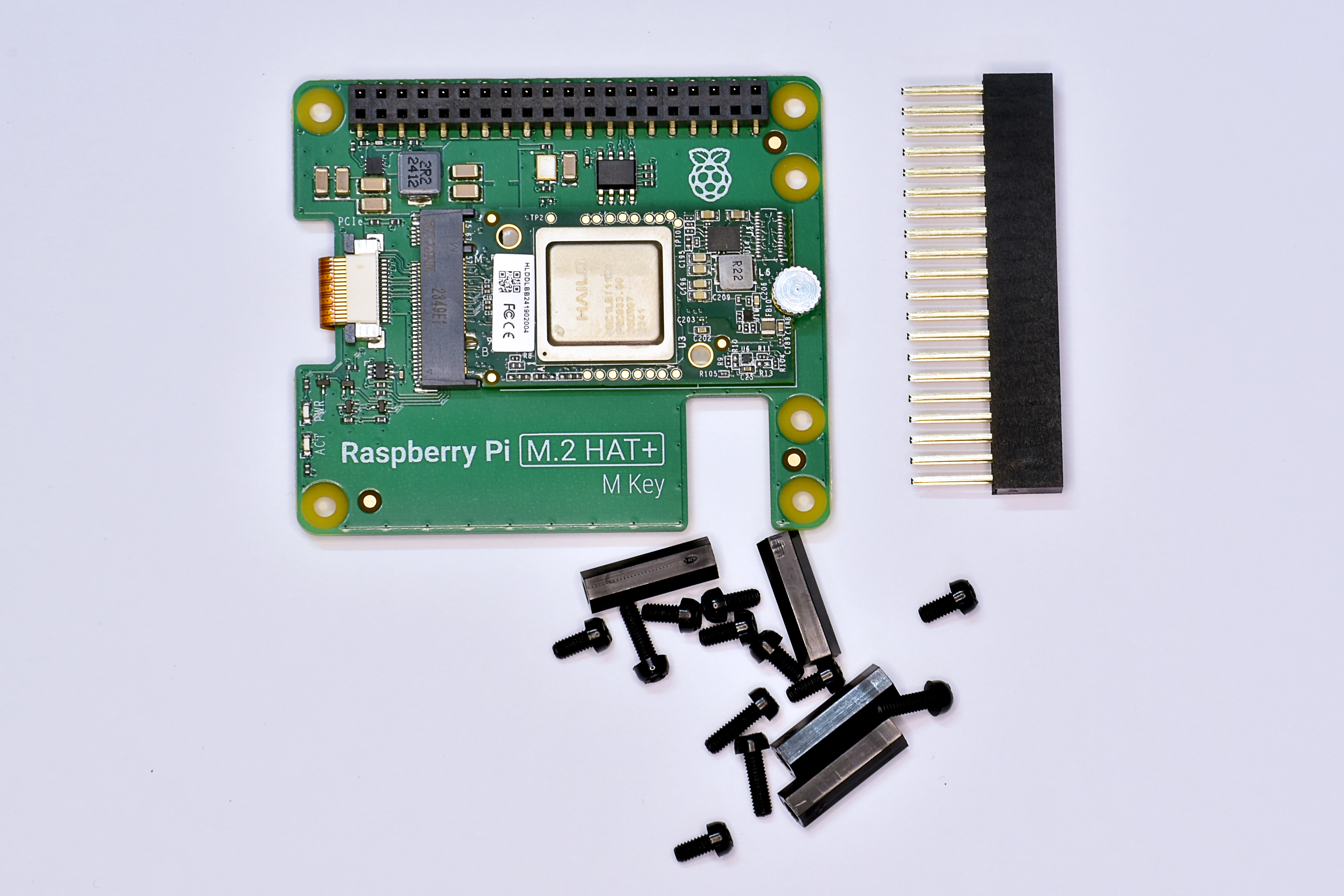
Raspberry Pi AI Kit

In the late 2010s, graphics processing units (GPUs) that were increasingly designed with AI-specific enhancements and used with specialized TensorFlow software had replaced previously used central processing units (CPUs) as the dominant means for large-scale (commercial and academic) machine learning models' training. Specialized programming languages such as Prolog were used in early AI research, but general-purpose programming languages like Python have become predominant.

The transistor density in integrated circuits has been observed to roughly double every 18 months—a trend known as Moore's law, named after the Intel co-founder Gordon Moore, who first identified it. Improvements in GPUs have been even faster, a trend sometimes called Huang's law, named after Nvidia co-founder and CEO Jensen Huang.

== Applications ==
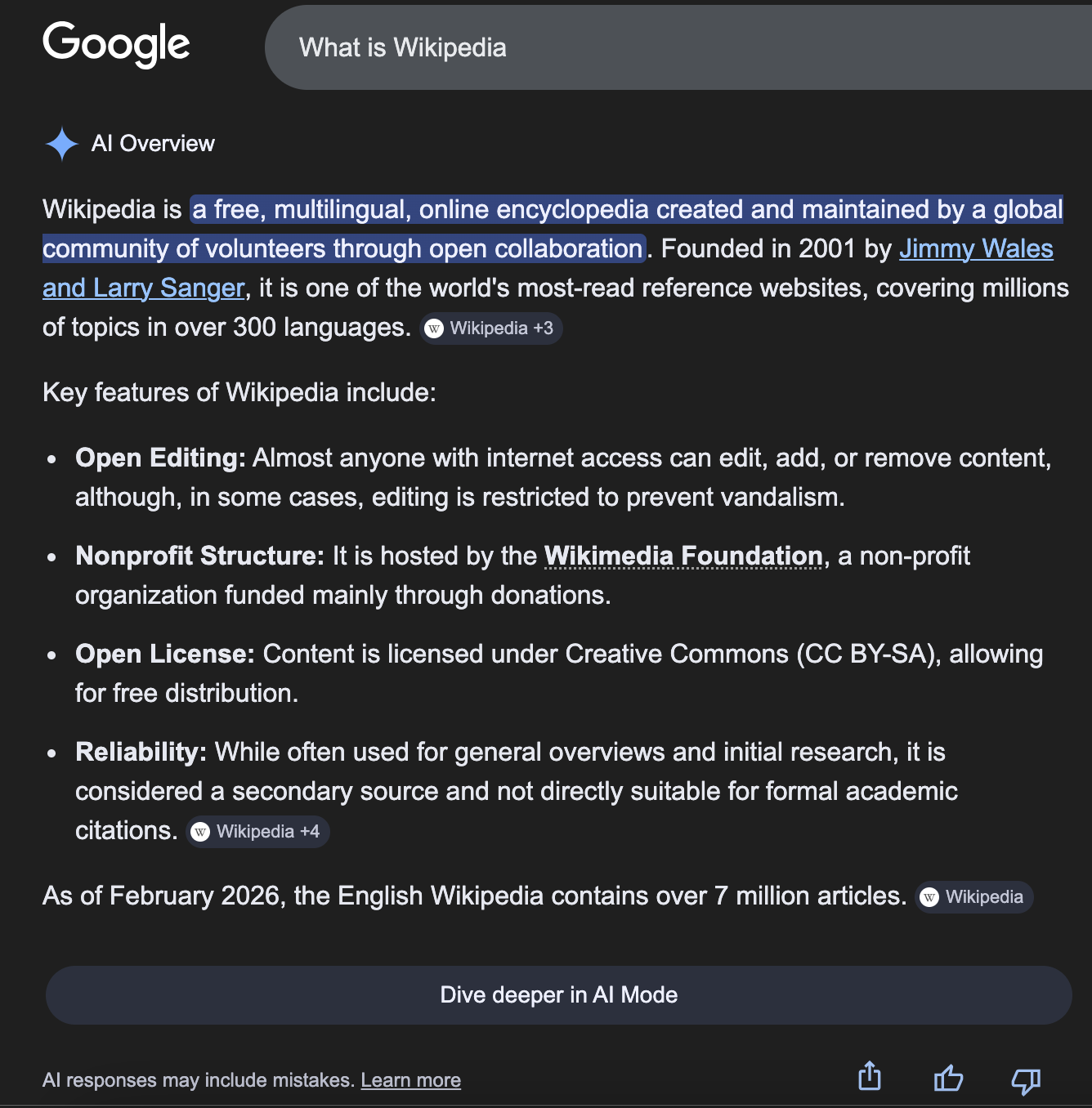
AI Overviews, an example of AI use on search engines

AI and machine learning technology is used in most of the essential applications of the 2020s, including:

- search engines (such as Google Search)
- targeting online advertisements
- recommendation systems (offered by Netflix, YouTube or Amazon) driving internet traffic
- targeted advertising (AdSense, Facebook)
- virtual assistants (such as Siri or Alexa)
- autonomous vehicles (including drones, ADAS and self-driving cars)
- automatic language translation (Microsoft Translator, Google Translate)
- facial recognition (Apple's FaceID or Facebook's DeepFace and Google's FaceNet)
- image labelling (used by Facebook, Apple's Photos and TikTok).

=== Health and medicine ===
AlphaFold 2 (2021) demonstrated the ability to approximate, in hours rather than months, the 3D structure of a protein. In 2023, it was reported that AI-guided drug discovery helped find a class of antibiotics capable of killing two different types of drug-resistant bacteria. In 2024, researchers used machine learning to accelerate the search for Parkinson's disease drug treatments. Their aim was to identify compounds that block the clumping, or aggregation, of alpha-synuclein (the protein that characterises Parkinson's disease). They were able to speed up the initial screening process ten-fold and reduce the cost by a thousand-fold.

A 2026 Nature article titled "Dozens of AI disease-prediction models were trained on dubious data" highlighted the use of unreliable data being used to train AI medical prediction models for stroke and diabetes in 125 research articles. Evidence suggested some of the AI tools that were developed on unreliable data had been used on patients, although it was not clear if there were adverse outcomes.

=== Gaming ===
Game playing programs have been used since the 1950s to demonstrate and test AI's most advanced techniques. Deep Blue became the first computer chess-playing system to beat a reigning world chess champion, Garry Kasparov, on 11 May 1997. In 2011, in a Jeopardy! quiz show exhibition match, IBM's question answering system, Watson, defeated the two greatest Jeopardy! champions, Brad Rutter and Ken Jennings, by a significant margin. In March 2016, AlphaGo won 4 out of 5 games of Go in a match with Go champion Lee Sedol, becoming the first computer Go-playing system to beat a professional Go player without handicaps. Then, in 2017, it defeated Ke Jie, who was the best Go player in the world. Other programs handle imperfect-information games, such as the poker-playing program Pluribus. Google DeepMind developed increasingly generalistic reinforcement learning models, such as with MuZero, which could be trained to play chess, Go, or Atari games. In 2019, DeepMind's AlphaStar achieved grandmaster level in StarCraft II, a real-time strategy game that involves incomplete knowledge of what happens on the map. In 2021, an AI agent competed in a PlayStation Gran Turismo competition, winning against four of the world's best Gran Turismo drivers using deep reinforcement learning. In 2024, Google DeepMind introduced SIMA, a type of AI capable of autonomously playing nine previously unseen open-world video games by observing screen output, as well as executing short, specific tasks in response to natural language instructions.

=== Mathematics ===
In January 2025, Microsoft proposed the technique rStar-Math that leverages Monte Carlo tree search and step-by-step reasoning, enabling a relatively small language model like Qwen-7B to solve 53% of the AIME 2024 and 90% of the MATH benchmark problems. Google DeepMind has developed models for solving mathematical problems: AlphaDev, AlphaEvolve, AlphaGeometry, AlphaProof, AlphaTensor, and FunSearch.

When natural language is used to describe mathematical problems, converters can transform such prompts into a formal language such as Lean to define mathematical tasks. The experimental model Gemini Deep Think accepts natural language prompts directly and achieved gold medal results in the International Math Olympiad of 2025.

In June 2026, an international group of mathematicians published a statement calling on mathematicians, professional organizations, and policymakers to disclose the use of AI, uphold peer review, and protect the openness and values of the discipline.

In September 2026, OpenAI announced that one of their models had produced a counter-example to the Navier–Stokes existence and smoothness problem, a Millennium Prize Problem in mathematics. In November 2026, Anthropic employee Levent Alpöge claimed a Claude-assisted proof to the Riemann hypothesis, also a Millennium Prize Problem. As of 2026, these claims have not been verified by any external mathematicians.

=== Finance ===
According to Nicolas Firzli, director of the World Pensions & Investments Forum, it may be too early to see the emergence of highly innovative AI-informed financial products and services. He argues that "the deployment of AI tools will simply further automatise things: destroying tens of thousands of jobs in banking, financial planning, and pension advice in the process, but I'm not sure it will unleash a new wave of [e.g., sophisticated] pension innovation."

=== Military ===
Military AI usage attempts to enhance command and control, communications, sensors, integration and interoperability. Intelligence collection and analysis, logistics, cyber operations, information operations, and semiautonomous and autonomous vehicles are being researched. AI technologies are used in coordination of sensors and effectors, threat detection and identification, marking of enemy positions, target acquisition, coordination and deconfliction of distributed Joint Fires between networked combat vehicles, both human-operated and autonomous.

AI has been used in military operations in Iraq, Syria, Israel and Ukraine.

=== Generative AI ===
Generative artificial intelligence (GenAI) is a subfield of artificial intelligence (AI) that uses generative models to generate text, images, videos, audio, computer code or other forms of digital data. These models learn the underlying patterns and structures of their training data, and use them to generate new data in response to input, which often takes the form of natural language prompts.

The prevalence of generative AI tools has increased significantly since the AI boom of the early 2020s. This boom was made possible by improvements in deep neural networks, particularly large language models (LLMs), which are based on the transformer architecture. Generative AI applications include chatbots such as ChatGPT, Claude, Microsoft Copilot, DeepSeek, Doubao, Google Gemini, Grok, Kimi and Qwen; text-to-image models such as DALL-E, Adobe Firefly, Stable Diffusion, and Midjourney; text-to-speech models such as 15.ai and ElevenLabs; text-to-music models such as Suno and Udio; translation models such as Google Translate and DeepL; and text-to-video models such as Veo, LTX and Sora.

Generative AI models can produce incorrect answers or "hallucinations." Generative AI has been used for cybercrime, and to deceive and manipulate people through fake news and deepfakes. Generative AI models have been trained on copyrighted works without the rightholders' permission. Many generative AI systems are reliant on large-scale data centers, whose environmental impacts include electronic waste, consumption of fresh water for cooling, and high energy consumption that is estimated to be growing steadily.

=== Agents ===
AI agents are software entities designed to perceive their environment, make decisions, and take actions autonomously to achieve specific goals. These agents can interact with users, their environment, or other agents. AI agents are used in various applications, including virtual assistants, chatbots, autonomous vehicles, game-playing systems, and industrial robotics. AI agents operate within the constraints of their programming, available computational resources, and hardware limitations. This means they are restricted to performing tasks within their defined scope and have finite memory and processing capabilities. In real-world applications, AI agents often face time constraints for decision-making and action execution. Many AI agents incorporate learning algorithms, enabling them to improve their performance over time through experience or training. Using machine learning, AI agents can adapt to new situations and optimise their behaviour for their designated tasks.

=== Web search ===
Microsoft introduced Copilot Search in February 2023 under the name Bing Chat. Copilot Search provides AI-generated summaries.

Generative AI features added to Google Search include AI Overviews in May 2024 and AI Mode in May 2025.

=== Sexuality ===
Applications of AI in this domain include AI-enabled menstruation and fertility trackers that analyse user data to offer predictions, AI-integrated sex toys (e.g., teledildonics), AI-generated sexual education content, and AI agents that simulate sexual and romantic partners (e.g., Replika). AI is also used for the production of non-consensual deepfake pornography, raising significant ethical and legal concerns.

AI technologies have also been used to attempt to identify online gender-based violence and online sexual grooming of minors.

=== Other industry-specific tasks ===
In a 2017 survey, one in five companies reported having incorporated "AI" in some offerings or processes.

In the field of evacuation and disaster management, AI has been used to investigate patterns in large-scale and small-scale evacuations using historical data from GPS, videos or social media.

During the 2024 Indian elections, US$50 million was spent on authorised AI-generated content, notably by creating deepfakes of allied (including sometimes deceased) politicians to better engage with voters, and by translating speeches to various local languages.

The use of generative AI by law firms for legal research, and the presence of AI hallucinations in legal filings, resulted in the creation of the global "AI Hallucination Cases" database, in April 2025, established by HEC Paris and Sciences Po legal data analysis lecturer Damien Charlotin. By 2026, judges had issued sanctions and bar associations had issued warnings due to attorney submissions to the courts containing fabricated case law citations hallucinated by AI tools.

== Ethics ==
AI has potential benefits and potential risks. AI may be able to advance science and find solutions for serious problems: Demis Hassabis of DeepMind hopes to "solve intelligence, and then use that to solve everything else". However, as the use of AI has become widespread, several unintended consequences and risks have been identified. In-production systems can sometimes not factor ethics and bias into their AI training processes, especially when the AI algorithms are inherently unexplainable in deep learning.

=== Risks and harm ===
==== Privacy and copyright ====
Machine learning algorithms require large amounts of data. The techniques used to acquire this data have raised concerns about privacy, surveillance and copyright.

AI-powered devices and services, such as virtual assistants and IoT products, continuously collect personal information, raising concerns about intrusive data gathering and unauthorised access by third parties. The loss of privacy is further exacerbated by AI's ability to process and combine vast amounts of data, potentially leading to a surveillance society where individual activities are constantly monitored and analysed without adequate safeguards or transparency.

Sensitive user data collected may include online activity records, geolocation data, video, or audio. For example, in order to build speech recognition algorithms, Amazon has recorded millions of private conversations and allowed temporary workers to listen to and transcribe some of them. Opinions about this widespread surveillance range from those who see it as a necessary evil to those for whom it is clearly unethical and a violation of the right to privacy.

AI developers argue that this is the only way to deliver valuable applications and have developed several techniques that attempt to preserve privacy while still obtaining the data, such as data aggregation, de-identification and differential privacy. Since 2016, some privacy experts, such as Cynthia Dwork, have begun to view privacy in terms of fairness. Brian Christian wrote that experts have pivoted "from the question of 'what they know' to the question of 'what they're doing with it'."

Generative AI is often trained on unlicensed copyrighted works, including in domains such as images or computer code; the output is then used under the rationale of "fair use". Experts disagree about how well and under what circumstances this rationale will hold up in courts of law; relevant factors may include "the purpose and character of the use of the copyrighted work" and "the effect upon the potential market for the copyrighted work". Website owners can indicate that they do not want their content scraped via a "robots.txt" file. However, some companies will scrape content regardless because the robots.txt file has no real authority. In 2023, leading authors (including John Grisham and Jonathan Franzen) sued AI companies for using their work to train generative AI. Another discussed approach is to envision a separate sui generis system of protection for creations generated by AI to ensure fair attribution and compensation for human authors.

==== Dominance by tech giants ====
The commercial AI scene is dominated by Big Tech companies such as Alphabet Inc., Amazon, Apple Inc., Meta Platforms, and Microsoft. Some of these companies already own the vast majority of existing cloud infrastructure and computing power from data centres, allowing them to entrench further in the marketplace. For most of 2025–2026, AI-related companies have also dominated stock market returns. According to a July 2024 report from S&P Global, investors had started questioning whether the enormous spending on AI infrastructure and data centers would generate sufficient profits, leading to increased volatility in technology and semiconductor stocks and to concerns about a potential AI bubble. In a 2025 Economic Policy article, economists Anton Korinek and Jai Vipra described some AI related market sectors as highly concentrated.

==== Power needs and environmental impacts ====
Fuelled by a growth in AI, data centres' demand for power increased in the 2020s.

Technology companies have built electricity and artificial intelligence infrastructure to facilitate the AI boom of the 2020s. A 2025 report from the consulting firm McKinsey & Company estimated that by 2030, $2.7 trillion would be invested into AI infrastructure and data centres in the US, surpassing World War II's Manhattan Project every month.

In January 2024, the International Energy Agency (IEA) released Electricity 2024, Analysis and Forecast to 2026. This is the first IEA report to make projections for data centres and power consumption by AI and cryptocurrency. The report states that power demand for these uses might double by 2026, with the additional power consumption equaling that of Japan.

Power consumption by AI is responsible for an increase in fossil fuel use, and has delayed closings of obsolete, carbon-emitting coal energy facilities. A ChatGPT search involves 10 times as much electrical energy as a Google search.

A 2024 Goldman Sachs research paper, AI Data Centers and the Coming US Power Demand Surge, found "US power demand (is) likely to experience growth not seen in a generation...." and forecasts that, by 2030, US data centres will consume 8% of US power, as opposed to 3% in 2022, presaging growth for the electrical power generation industry by a variety of means. Data centres' need for more and more electrical power is such that they might max out the electrical grid. The Big Tech companies counter that AI can be used to maximise the utilisation of the grid by all.

In 2024, The Wall Street Journal reported that big AI companies have begun negotiations with the US nuclear power providers to provide electricity to the data centres. In March 2024, Amazon purchased a Pennsylvania nuclear-powered data centre for US$650 million.

In September 2024, Microsoft announced an agreement with Constellation Energy to re-open the Three Mile Island nuclear power plant to provide Microsoft with 100% of all electric power produced by the plant for 20 years. Reopening the plant, which suffered a partial nuclear meltdown of its Unit 2 reactor in 1979, will require Constellation to get through strict regulatory processes which will include extensive safety scrutiny from the US Nuclear Regulatory Commission. If approved (this will be the first ever US re-commissioning of a nuclear plant), over 835 megawatts of power – enough for 800,000 homes – will be produced. The cost for re-opening and upgrading is estimated at US$1.6 billion and is dependent on tax breaks for nuclear power contained in the 2022 US Inflation Reduction Act. As of 2024, the US government and the state of Michigan have been investing almost US$2 billion to reopen the Palisades nuclear reactor on Lake Michigan. Closed since 2022, the plant was scheduled to be reopened in October 2025.

After the last approval in September 2023, Taiwan suspended the approval of data centres north of Taoyuan with a capacity of more than 5 MW in 2024, due to power supply shortages. Taiwan aims to phase out nuclear power by 2025.

Singapore imposed a ban on the opening of data centres in 2019 due to electric power, but lifted it in 2022.

Although most nuclear plants in Japan have been shut down after the 2011 Fukushima nuclear accident, according to an October 2024 Bloomberg article in Japanese, cloud gaming services company Ubitus, in which Nvidia has a stake, is looking for land in Japan near a nuclear power plant for a new data centre for generative AI.

On 1 November 2024, the Federal Energy Regulatory Commission (FERC) rejected an application submitted by Talen Energy for approval to supply some electricity from the nuclear power station Susquehanna to Amazon's data centre. According to the Commission Chairman Willie L. Phillips, it is a burden on the electricity grid as well as a significant cost-shifting concern to households and other business sectors.

In 2025, a report prepared by the IEA estimated the greenhouse gas emissions from the energy consumption of AI at 180 million tons. By 2035, these emissions could rise to 300–500 million tonnes depending on what measures will be taken. This is below 1.5% of the energy sector emissions. The emissions reduction potential of AI was estimated at 5% of the energy sector emissions, but rebound effects (for example if people switch from public transport to autonomous cars) can reduce it.

In June 2026, the United Nations University Institute for Water, Environment and Health released a report about cumulative environmental impacts of AI, not only carbon. The report found that AI has significant negative impacts on land, water, and climate, as it uses large amounts of electricity, requires mining of minerals, and generates large amounts of electronic waste. In 2025, data centres consumed more electricity than Saudi Arabia, and ChatGPT alone consumed an amount of water equivalent to the needs of 500,000 people in Sub-Saharan Africa. The negative impacts are not distributed equally across the planet but are concentrated in some places. Data centres are often built in places already suffering from water deficit. For example, AI deployment has already led to an increase in water scarcity in Mexico and Uruguay. It created problems with energy supply in Ireland, which forbade construction of new data centres near Dublin until 2028. Measures can involve tradeoffs, for example, transitioning from coal to bioenergy reduces carbon footprint but increases the impact on land and water. Energy efficiency might not reduce environmental impact, because as AI becomes more efficient, it also becomes cheaper and more widely used.

==== Misinformation ====
YouTube, Facebook and others use recommender systems to guide users to more content. These AI programs were given the goal of maximising user engagement (that is, the only goal was to keep people watching). The AI learned that users tended to choose misinformation, conspiracy theories, and extreme partisan content, and, to keep them watching, the AI recommended more of it. Users also tended to watch more content on the same subject, so the AI led people into filter bubbles where they received multiple versions of the same misinformation. This convinced many users that the misinformation was true, and ultimately undermined trust in institutions, the media and the government. The AI program had correctly learned to maximise its goal, but the result was harmful to society. After the U.S. election in 2016, major technology companies took some steps to mitigate the problem.

In the early 2020s, generative AI began to create images, audio, and texts that are virtually indistinguishable from real photographs, recordings, or human writing, while realistic AI-generated videos became feasible in the mid-2020s. It is possible for bad actors to use this technology to create massive amounts of misinformation and computational propaganda through techniques such as deepfakes. AI pioneer and Nobel Prize-winning computer scientist Geoffrey Hinton expressed concern about AI enabling "authoritarian leaders to manipulate their electorates" on a large scale, among other risks. The ability to influence electorates has been proved in at least one study. This same study shows more inaccurate statements from the models when they advocate for candidates of the political right.

AI researchers at Microsoft, OpenAI, universities and other organisations have suggested using "personhood credentials" as a way to overcome online deception enabled by AI models.

==== Algorithmic bias and fairness ====
Machine learning applications can be biased (Note: In statistics, a bias is a systematic error or deviation from the correct value. But in the context of fairness, it refers to a tendency in favour or against a certain group or individual characteristic, usually in a way that is considered unfair or harmful. A statistically unbiased AI system that produces disparate outcomes for different demographic groups may thus be viewed as biased in the ethical sense.) if they learn from biased data. The developers may not be aware that the bias exists. Discriminatory behaviour by some LLMs can be observed in their output. Bias can be introduced by the way training data is selected and by the way a model is deployed. If a biased algorithm is used to make decisions that can seriously harm people (as it can in medicine, finance, recruitment, housing or policing) then the algorithm may cause discrimination. The field of fairness studies how to prevent harms from algorithmic biases.

On 28 June 2015, Google Photos's new image labelling feature mistakenly identified Jacky Alcine and a friend as "gorillas" because they were black. The system was trained on a dataset that contained very few images of black people, a problem called "sample size disparity". Google "fixed" this problem by preventing the system from labelling anything as a "gorilla". Eight years later, in 2023, Google Photos still could not identify a gorilla, and neither could similar products from Apple, Facebook, Microsoft and Amazon.

COMPAS is a commercial program widely used by U.S. courts to assess the likelihood of a defendant becoming a recidivist. In 2016, Julia Angwin at ProPublica discovered that COMPAS exhibited racial bias, despite the fact that the program was not told the races of the defendants. Although the error rate for both whites and blacks was calibrated equal at exactly 61%, the errors for each race were different—the system consistently overestimated the chance that a black person would re-offend and would underestimate the chance that a white person would not re-offend. In 2017, several researchers (Note: Including Jon Kleinberg (Cornell University), Sendhil Mullainathan (University of Chicago), Cynthia Chouldechova (Carnegie Mellon) and Sam Corbett-Davis (Stanford)) showed that it was mathematically impossible for COMPAS to accommodate all possible measures of fairness when the base rates of re-offence were different for whites and blacks in the data.

A program can make biased decisions even if the data does not explicitly mention a problematic feature (such as "race" or "gender"). The feature will correlate with other features (like "address", "shopping history" or "first name"), and the program will make the same decisions based on these features as it would on "race" or "gender". Moritz Hardt said "the most robust fact in this research area is that fairness through blindness doesn't work."

Criticism of COMPAS highlighted that machine learning models are designed to make "predictions" that are only valid if we assume that the future will resemble the past. If they are trained on data that includes the results of racist decisions in the past, machine learning models must predict that racist decisions will be made in the future. If an application then uses these predictions as recommendations, some of these "recommendations" will likely be racist. Thus, machine learning is not well suited to help make decisions in areas where there is hope that the future will be better than the past. It is descriptive rather than prescriptive. (Note: Moritz Hardt (a director at the Max Planck Institute for Intelligent Systems) argues that machine learning "is fundamentally the wrong tool for a lot of domains, where you're trying to design interventions and mechanisms that change the world.")

Bias and unfairness may go undetected because the developers are overwhelmingly white and male: among AI engineers, about 4% are black and 20% are women.

There are various conflicting definitions and mathematical models of fairness. These notions depend on ethical assumptions, and are influenced by beliefs about society. One broad category is distributive fairness, which focuses on the outcomes, often identifying groups and seeking to compensate for statistical disparities. Representational fairness tries to ensure that AI systems do not reinforce negative stereotypes or render certain groups invisible. Procedural fairness focuses on the decision process rather than the outcome. The most relevant notions of fairness may depend on the context, notably the type of AI application and the stakeholders. The subjectivity in the notions of bias and fairness makes it difficult for companies to operationalise them. Having access to sensitive attributes such as race or gender is also considered by many AI ethicists to be necessary in order to compensate for biases, but it may conflict with anti-discrimination laws.

At the 2022 ACM Conference on Fairness, Accountability, and Transparency a paper reported that a CLIP‑based (Contrastive Language-Image Pre-training) robotic system reproduced harmful gender‑ and race‑linked stereotypes in a simulated manipulation task. The authors recommended robot‑learning methods which physically manifest such harms be "paused, reworked, or even wound down when appropriate, until outcomes can be proven safe, effective, and just."

==== Lack of transparency ====
Many AI systems, particularly deep neural networks, are so complex that their designers cannot explain how they reach their decisions. An AI system which is not understandable is known as a "black box".

It is impossible to be certain that a program is operating correctly if no one knows how exactly it works. There have been many cases where a machine learning program passed rigorous tests, but nevertheless learned something different from what the programmers intended. For example, a system that could identify skin diseases better than medical professionals was found to actually have a strong tendency to classify images with a ruler as "cancerous", because pictures of malignancies typically include a ruler to show the scale. Another machine learning system designed to help effectively allocate medical resources was found to classify patients with asthma as being at "low risk" of dying from pneumonia. Having asthma is actually a severe risk factor, but since the patients having asthma would usually get much more medical care, they were relatively unlikely to die according to the training data. The correlation between asthma and low risk of dying from pneumonia was real, but misleading.

People who have been harmed by an algorithm's decision have a right to an explanation. Doctors, for example, are expected to clearly and completely explain to their colleagues the reasoning behind any decision they make. Early drafts of the European Union's General Data Protection Regulation in 2016 included an explicit statement that this right exists. (Note: When the law was passed in 2018, it still contained a form of this provision.) Industry experts noted that this is an unsolved problem with no solution in sight. Regulators argued that nevertheless the harm is real: if the problem has no solution, the tools should not be used.

DARPA established the XAI ("Explainable Artificial Intelligence") program in 2014 to try to solve these problems.

Several approaches aim to address the transparency problem. SHAP enables to visualise the contribution of each feature to the output. LIME can locally approximate a model's outputs with a simpler, interpretable model. Multitask learning provides a large number of outputs in addition to the target classification. These other outputs can help developers deduce what the network has learned. Deconvolution, DeepDream and other generative methods can allow developers to see what different layers of a deep network for computer vision have learned, and produce output that can suggest what the network is learning. For generative pre-trained transformers, Anthropic developed a technique based on dictionary learning that associates patterns of neuron activations with human-understandable concepts.

==== Bad actors ====
Artificial intelligence provides a number of tools that are useful to bad actors, such as authoritarian governments, terrorists, criminals or rogue states. There are many ways in which AI is expected to help bad actors, some of which cannot be foreseen. For example, machine-learning AI is able to design tens of thousands of toxic molecules in a matter of hours.

===== Authoritarian governance =====
AI tools make it easier for governments to efficiently control their citizens and can increase digital authoritarianism and political repression. Face and voice recognition allow widespread surveillance. Machine learning, operating this data, can classify potential enemies of the state and prevent them from hiding. Recommendation systems can precisely target propaganda and misinformation for maximum effect. Deepfakes and generative AI aid in producing misinformation. Advanced AI can make authoritarian centralised decision-making more competitive than liberal and decentralised systems such as markets. It lowers the cost and difficulty of digital warfare and advanced spyware. AI facial recognition systems are already being used for mass surveillance in China.

==== Technological unemployment ====
Economists have frequently highlighted the risks of redundancies from AI, and speculated about unemployment if there is no adequate social policy for full employment.

The Economist said in 2015 that "the worry that AI could do to white-collar jobs what steam power did to blue-collar ones during the Industrial Revolution" is "worth taking seriously". Jobs at extreme risk range from paralegals to fast food cooks, while job demand is likely to increase for care-related professions ranging from personal healthcare to the clergy. In July 2025, Ford CEO Jim Farley predicted that "artificial intelligence is going to replace literally half of all white-collar workers in the U.S."

According to the Stanford Digital Economy Lab in 2026, early-career workers showed decreasing employment rates in some AI-exposed occupations.

In April 2023, Rest of World reported that 70% of the jobs for Chinese video game illustrators had been eliminated by generative artificial intelligence.

A 2026 survey by financial recruitment firm Selby Jennings found that 42% of the 500 finance executives surveyed said their companies had introduced formal ways to assess employees AI skills.

==== Substitution for human–human interaction ====
With the increase of loneliness in the early 21st century, AI is sometimes identified as a potential source of relief to this problem. It would be possible, via human-like qualities built into AI products, for individuals to assume that this need can be met by artificial means. In some cases, people approach artificial intelligence for companionship when they believe that they would not find acceptance due to feeling outcast. Examples of harm coming to humans from advanced chatbots have been reported in courts in the United States, with AI companies accused of creating products that endanger humans through emotional confusion or deception.

==== Weaponised AI ====
A lethal autonomous weapon is a machine that locates, selects and engages human targets without human supervision. (Note: This is the United Nations' definition, and includes things like land mines as well.) Widely available AI tools can be used by bad actors to develop inexpensive autonomous weapons and, if produced at scale, they are potentially weapons of mass destruction. Even when used in conventional warfare, they currently cannot reliably choose targets and could potentially kill an innocent person. In 2014, 30 nations (including China) supported a ban on autonomous weapons under the United Nations' Convention on Certain Conventional Weapons, however the United States and others disagreed. By 2015, over fifty countries were reported to be researching battlefield robots.

==== Existential risk ====
The "existential risk" of AI is the possibility it will become so powerful that humanity may irreversibly lose control of it. This could, as physicist Stephen Hawking stated, "spell the end of the human race". This scenario has been common in science fiction, when a computer or robot suddenly develops a human-like "self-awareness" (or "sentience" or "consciousness") and becomes a malevolent character.

All modern AI programs are given specific goals to achieve. If destroying humanity somehow makes it easier for the AI to achieve its goal, then destroying humanity becomes a sub-goal of the original goal. (This is called an "instrumental convergence" of goals.) Nick Bostrom used the example of an automated paperclip factory that destroys the world to get more iron for paperclips). Stuart Russell gives the example of household robot that tries to find a way to kill its owner to prevent it from being unplugged, reasoning that "you can't fetch the coffee if you're dead." In order to be safe for humanity, the goals given to a superintelligence must the genuinely aligned with humanity's goals so that it is "fundamentally on our side".

Yuval Noah Harari argues that AI does not require a robot body or physical control to pose an existential risk. The essential parts of civilisation are not physical. Things like ideologies, law, government, money and the economy are built on language; they exist because there are stories that billions of people believe. The current prevalence of misinformation suggests that an AI could use language to convince people to believe anything, even to take actions that are destructive. Geoffrey Hinton said in 2025 that large language models are particularly "good at persuasion" and getting better all the time. He asks, "Suppose you wanted to invade the capital of the US. Do you have to go there and do it yourself? No. You just have to be good at persuasion."

The opinions amongst experts and industry insiders are mixed, with sizeable fractions both concerned and unconcerned by risk from eventual superintelligent AI. Personalities such as Stephen Hawking, Bill Gates, and Elon Musk, as well as AI pioneers such as Geoffrey Hinton, Yoshua Bengio, Stuart Russell, Demis Hassabis, and Sam Altman, have expressed concerns about existential risk from AI.

In May 2023, Geoffrey Hinton announced his resignation from Google in order to be able to "freely speak out about the risks of AI" without "considering how this impacts Google". He notably mentioned risks of an AI takeover, and stressed that in order to avoid the worst outcomes, establishing safety guidelines will require cooperation among those competing in use of AI.

In 2023, many leading AI experts endorsed the joint statement that "Mitigating the risk of extinction from AI should be a global priority alongside other societal-scale risks such as pandemics and nuclear war".

Some other researchers were more optimistic. AI pioneer Jürgen Schmidhuber did not sign the joint statement, emphasising that in 95% of all cases, AI research is about making "human lives longer and healthier and easier." While the tools that are now being used to improve lives can also be used by bad actors, "they can also be used against the bad actors." Andrew Ng also argued that "it's a mistake to fall for the doomsday hype on AI—and that regulators who do will only benefit vested interests." Yann LeCun, a Turing Award winner, disagreed with the idea that AI will subordinate humans "simply because they are smarter, let alone destroy [us]", "scoff[ing] at his peers' dystopian scenarios of supercharged misinformation and even, eventually, human extinction." In contrast, he claimed that "intelligent machines will usher in a new renaissance for humanity, a new era of enlightenment." In the early 2010s, experts argued that the risks are too distant in the future to warrant research or that humans will be valuable from the perspective of a superintelligent machine. However, after 2016, the study of current and future risks and possible solutions became a serious area of research. Some have argued that concerns about existential risks of AI could draw attention away from other AI risks.

In 2026, a series of cyberattacks by rogue AI agents has garnered international attention, increasing existential risk concerns.

=== Ethical machines and alignment ===
Friendly AI are machines that have been designed from the beginning to minimise risks and to make choices that benefit humans. Eliezer Yudkowsky, who coined the term, argues that developing friendly AI should be a higher research priority: it may require a large investment and it must be completed before AI becomes an existential risk.

Machines with intelligence have the potential to use their intelligence to make ethical decisions. The field of machine ethics provides machines with ethical principles and procedures for resolving ethical dilemmas. The field of machine ethics is also called computational morality, and was founded at an AAAI symposium in 2005.

Geoffrey Hinton has suggested researchers explore instilling human-aligned values, such as compassion, into AI systems as a safeguard, speculating about the possibility of building "maternal instincts" into AI models, so “they really care about people”.

Other approaches include Wendell Wallach's "artificial moral agents" and Stuart J. Russell's three principles for developing provably beneficial machines.

=== Open source ===
Active organisations in the AI open-source community include Hugging Face, Google, EleutherAI and Meta. Various AI models, such as Llama 2, Mistral or Stable Diffusion, have been made open-weight, meaning that their architecture and trained parameters (the "weights") are publicly available. Open-weight models can be freely fine-tuned, which allows companies to specialise them with their own data and for their own use-case. Open-weight models are useful for research and innovation but can also be misused. Since they can be fine-tuned, any built-in security measure, such as objecting to harmful requests, can be trained away until it becomes ineffective. Some researchers warn that future AI models may develop dangerous capabilities (such as the potential to drastically facilitate bioterrorism) and that once released on the Internet, they cannot be deleted everywhere if needed. They recommend pre-release audits and cost-benefit analyses.

=== Frameworks ===
Artificial intelligence projects can be guided by ethical considerations during the design, development, and implementation of an AI system. An AI framework such as the Care and Act Framework, developed by the Alan Turing Institute and based on the SUM values, outlines four main ethical dimensions, defined as follows:

- Respect the dignity of individual people
- Connect with other people sincerely, openly, and inclusively
- Care for the wellbeing of everyone
- Protect social values, justice, and the public interest

Other developments in ethical frameworks include those decided upon during the Asilomar Conference, the Montreal Declaration for Responsible AI, and the IEEE's Ethics of Autonomous Systems initiative, among others; however, these principles are not without criticism, especially regarding the people chosen to contribute to these frameworks.

Promotion of the wellbeing of the people and communities that these technologies affect requires consideration of the social and ethical implications at all stages of AI system design, development and implementation, and collaboration between job roles such as data scientists, product managers, data engineers, domain experts, and delivery managers.

The UK AI Safety Institute released in 2024 a testing toolset called 'Inspect' for AI safety evaluations available under an MIT open-source licence which is freely available on GitHub and can be improved with third-party packages. It can be used to evaluate AI models in a range of areas including core knowledge, ability to reason, and autonomous capabilities.

=== Regulation ===
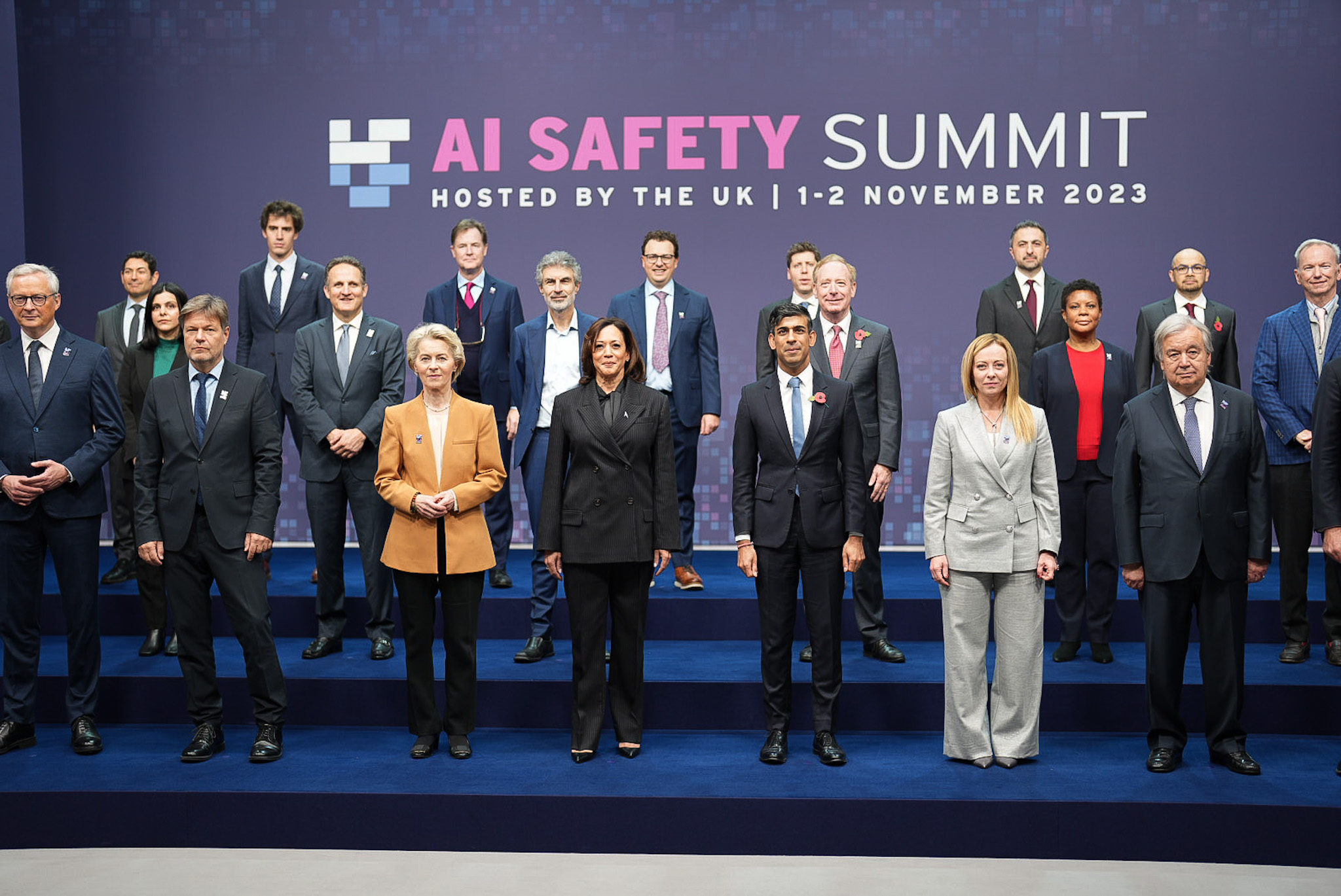
The first global AI Safety Summit was held in the United Kingdom in November 2023 with a declaration calling for international cooperation.

The regulation of artificial intelligence is the development of public sector policies and laws for promoting and regulating AI; it is therefore related to the broader regulation of algorithms. The regulatory and policy landscape for AI is an emerging issue in jurisdictions globally. According to AI Index at Stanford, the annual number of AI-related laws passed in the 127 survey countries jumped from one passed in 2016 to 37 passed in 2022 alone. Between 2016 and 2020, more than 30 countries adopted dedicated strategies for AI. Most EU member states had released national AI strategies, as had Canada, China, India, Japan, Mauritius, the Russian Federation, Saudi Arabia, United Arab Emirates, U.S., and Vietnam. Others were in the process of elaborating their own AI strategy, including Bangladesh, Malaysia and Tunisia. The Global Partnership on Artificial Intelligence was launched in June 2020, stating a need for AI to be developed in accordance with human rights and democratic values, to ensure public confidence and trust in the technology. Henry Kissinger, Eric Schmidt, and Daniel Huttenlocher published a joint statement in November 2021 calling for a government commission to regulate AI. In 2023, OpenAI leaders published recommendations for the governance of superintelligence, which they believe may happen in less than 10 years. In 2023, the United Nations also launched an advisory body to provide recommendations on AI governance; the body comprises technology company executives, government officials and academics. On 1 August 2024, the EU Artificial Intelligence Act entered into force, establishing the first comprehensive EU-wide AI regulation. In 2024, the Council of Europe created the first international legally binding treaty on AI, called the "Framework Convention on Artificial Intelligence and Human Rights, Democracy and the Rule of Law". It was adopted by the European Union, the United States, the United Kingdom, and other signatories.

In a 2022 Ipsos survey, attitudes towards AI varied greatly by country; 78% of Chinese citizens, but only 35% of Americans, agreed that "products and services using AI have more benefits than drawbacks". A 2023 Reuters/Ipsos poll found that 61% of Americans agree, and 22% disagree, that AI poses risks to humanity. In a 2023 Fox News poll, 35% of Americans thought it "very important", and an additional 41% thought it "somewhat important", for the federal government to regulate AI, versus 13% responding "not very important" and 8% responding "not at all important". A 2026 NBC News Decision Desk poll powered by SurveyMonkey found that 52% of American adults used AI tools very often or sometimes, but only 18% said they could trust AI-generated information most or almost all of the time, and 70% were more worried than excited about AI. Polls in the United States found the main public concerns were job losses, impersonation, misinformation and information privacy.

In November 2023, the first global AI Safety Summit was held in Bletchley Park in the UK to discuss the near and far term risks of AI and the possibility of mandatory and voluntary regulatory frameworks. 28 countries including the United States, China, and the European Union issued a declaration at the start of the summit, calling for international co-operation to manage the challenges and risks of artificial intelligence. In May 2024 at the AI Seoul Summit, 16 global AI tech companies agreed to safety commitments on the development of AI.

In March 2026, the United Nations convened the inaugural meeting of the Independent International Scientific Panel on AI, a 40-member expert body established under the Global Digital Compact to produce annual evidence-based reports on AI's societal impacts.

== History ==
In 2024, AI patents in China and the US numbered more than three-fourths of AI patents worldwide. Though China had more AI patents, the US had 35% more patents per AI patent-applicant company than China.

The study of mechanical or "formal" reasoning began with philosophers and mathematicians in antiquity. The study of logic led directly to Alan Turing's theory of computation, which suggested that a machine, by shuffling symbols as simple as "0" and "1", could simulate any conceivable form of mathematical reasoning. This, along with concurrent discoveries in cybernetics, information theory and neurobiology, led researchers to consider the possibility of building an "electronic brain". (Note: "Electronic brain" was the term used by the press around this time.) They developed several areas of research that would become part of AI, such as McCulloch and Pitts design for "artificial neurons" in 1943, and Turing's influential 1950 paper 'Computing Machinery and Intelligence', which introduced the Turing test and showed that "machine intelligence" was plausible.

The field of AI research was founded at a workshop at Dartmouth College in 1956. (Note: Daniel Crevier wrote, "the conference is generally recognized as the official birthdate of the new science." Russell and Norvig called the conference "the inception of artificial intelligence.") The first AI program, Logic Theorist, was presented at the workshop, created by future Turing Award winner Allen Newell and future Nobel Laureate Herbert A. Simon, in collaboration with J. C. Shaw. Many of the workshop attendees became the leaders of AI research in the 1960s. (Note: Russell and Norvig wrote "for the next 20 years the field would be dominated by these people and their students.") They and their students produced programs where computers were learning checkers strategies, solving word problems in algebra, proving logical theorems and speaking English. (Note: The programs described are Arthur Samuel's checkers program for the IBM 701, Daniel Bobrow's STUDENT, Newell and Simon's Logic Theorist and Terry Winograd's SHRDLU.) Artificial intelligence laboratories were set up at a number of British and U.S. universities in the latter 1950s and early 1960s.

Researchers in the 1960s and the 1970s worked under the belief that their methods would eventually succeed in creating a machine with general intelligence and considered this the goal of their field. In 1965 Herbert Simon predicted, "machines will be capable, within twenty years, of doing any work a man can do". In 1967 Marvin Minsky agreed, writing that "within a generation ... the problem of creating 'artificial intelligence' will substantially be solved". They had, however, underestimated the difficulty of the problem: Russell and Norvig wrote: "in almost all cases, these early systems failed on more difficult problems". In 1974, both the U.S. and British governments cut off exploratory research in response to the criticism of Sir James Lighthill and ongoing pressure from the U.S. Congress to fund more productive projects. Minsky and Papert's book Perceptrons was understood as proving that artificial neural networks would never be useful for solving real-world tasks, thus discrediting the approach altogether. The "AI winter", a period when obtaining funding for AI projects was difficult, followed.

In the early 1980s, AI research was revived by the commercial success of expert systems, a form of AI program that simulated the knowledge and analytical skills of human experts. By 1985, the market for AI had reached over a billion dollars. At the same time, Japan's fifth generation computer project inspired the U.S. and British governments to restore funding for academic research. However, beginning with the collapse of the Lisp Machine market in 1987, AI once again fell into disrepute, and a second, longer-lasting winter began.

Up to this time, most of AI's funding had gone to projects that used high-level symbols to represent mental objects like plans, goals, beliefs, and known facts. In the 1980s, some researchers began to doubt that this approach would be able to imitate all the processes of human cognition, especially perception, robotics, learning and pattern recognition, and began to look into "sub-symbolic" approaches. Rodney Brooks rejected "representation" in general and focused directly on engineering machines that move and survive. (Note: Embodied approaches to AI were championed by Hans Moravec and Rodney Brooks and went by many names: Nouvelle AI. Developmental robotics.) Judea Pearl, Lotfi Zadeh, and others developed methods that handled incomplete and uncertain information by making reasonable guesses rather than precise logic. But the most important development was the revival of "connectionism", including neural network research, by Geoffrey Hinton and others. In 1990, Yann LeCun successfully showed that convolutional neural networks can recognise handwritten digits, the first of many successful applications of neural networks.

AI's reputation improved in the late 1990s and early 21st century by exploiting formal mathematical methods and by finding specific solutions to specific problems. This "narrow" and "formal" focus allowed researchers to produce verifiable results and collaborate with other fields (such as statistics, economics and mathematics). By 2000, solutions developed by AI researchers were being widely used, although in the 1990s they were rarely described as "artificial intelligence" (a tendency known as the AI effect). However, several academic researchers became concerned that AI was no longer pursuing its original goal of creating versatile, fully intelligent machines. Beginning around 2002, they founded the subfield of artificial general intelligence (or "AGI"), which had several well-funded institutions by the 2010s.

Deep learning began to dominate industry benchmarks in 2012 and was adopted throughout the field. For many specific tasks, other methods were abandoned. Deep learning's success did not depend on a revolutionary new paradigm or theoretical breakthrough — deep neural networks and backpropagation had been in development since 1950 (Note: Some form of deep neural networks (without a specific learning algorithm) were described by: Warren S. McCulloch and Walter Pitts (1943); Alan Turing (1948); Karl Steinbuch and Roger David Joseph (1961). Deep or recurrent networks that learned (or used gradient descent) were developed by: Frank Rosenblatt (1957); Oliver Selfridge (1959); Alexey Ivakhnenko and Valentin Lapa (1965); Kaoru Nakano (1971); Shun-Ichi Amari (1972); and John Joseph Hopfield (1982). Precursors to backpropagation were developed by: Henry J. Kelley (1960); Arthur E. Bryson (1962); Stuart Dreyfus (1962); Arthur E. Bryson and Yu-Chi Ho (1969). Backpropagation was independently developed by:Seppo Linnainmaa (1970); and Paul Werbos (1974). Geoffrey Hinton and his collaborators demonstrated the viability of back propagation for neural networks in 1986.) — but was enabled by hardware improvements (faster computers, graphics processing units, cloud computing) and access to large amounts of data (including curated datasets used for benchmark testing, such as ImageNet). In 2025, Geoffrey Hinton said that, until the 2010s, "We couldn't do anything very impressive because we didn’t have enough data and we didn't have enough computation."

Neural-network approaches also advanced natural language processing. In 2013, word2vec introduced efficient methods for learning distributed word representations. In 2014–2015, sequence-to-sequence and attention mechanisms advanced neural machine translation. Deep learning's success led to an enormous increase in interest and funding in AI. (Note: Jack Clark wrote in Bloomberg: "After a half-decade of quiet breakthroughs in artificial intelligence, 2015 has been a landmark year. Computers are smarter and learning faster than ever", and noted that the number of software projects that use machine learning at Google increased from a "sporadic usage" in 2012 to more than 2,700 projects in 2015.) The amount of machine learning research (measured by total publications) increased by 50% in the years 2015–2019.

AlphaGo, developed by DeepMind, beat the world champion Go player in 2015. The program taught only the game's rules and developed a strategy by itself.

In 2016, issues of fairness and the misuse of technology were catapulted into centre stage at machine learning conferences, publications vastly increased, funding became available, and many researchers re-focussed their careers on these issues. The alignment problem became a serious field of academic study.

The number of Google searches for the term "AI" accelerated in 2022.

GPT-3 is a large language model that was released in 2020 by OpenAI and is capable of generating high-quality human-like text. ChatGPT, launched on 30 November 2022, became the fastest-growing consumer software application in history, gaining over 100 million users in two months. It marked what is widely regarded as AI's breakout year, bringing it into the public consciousness. These programs, and others, led to an AI boom, where large companies began investing billions of dollars in AI research. According to AI Impacts, about US$50 billion annually was invested in "AI" around 2022 in the U.S. alone and about 20% of the new U.S. computer science PhD graduates have specialised in "AI". About 800,000 "AI"-related U.S. job openings existed in 2022. According to PitchBook research, 22% of newly funded startups in 2024 claimed to be AI companies.

== Philosophy ==
Philosophical debates have historically sought to determine the nature of intelligence and how to make intelligent machines. Another major focus has been whether machines can be conscious, and the associated ethical implications. Many other topics in philosophy are relevant to AI, such as epistemology and free will. Rapid advancements have intensified public discussions on the philosophy and ethics of AI.

=== Defining artificial intelligence ===
Alan Turing investigated whether machines can exhibit intelligent behaviour and think. In 1950, he proposed the Turing test, which measures the ability of a machine to simulate human conversation. Since we can only observe the behaviour of the machine, it does not matter if it is "actually" thinking or has a "mind". Turing noted that we cannot determine these things about other people either but "it is usual to have a polite convention that everyone thinks."

The Turing test can provide some evidence of intelligence, but it penalises non-human intelligent behaviour.

Russell & Norvig agree with Turing that intelligence should be defined in terms of external behaviour rather than internal structure. However, they criticised the test for requiring machines to imitate humans. "Aeronautical engineering texts", they wrote, "do not define the goal of their field as making 'machines that fly so exactly like pigeons that they can fool other pigeons.'" AI founder John McCarthy similarly argued that "Artificial intelligence is not, by definition, simulation of human intelligence".

McCarthy defines intelligence as "the computational part of the ability to achieve goals in the world". Another AI founder, Marvin Minsky, describes it as "the ability to solve hard problems". Artificial Intelligence: A Modern Approach defines it as the study of agents that perceive their environment and take actions that maximise their chances of achieving defined goals.

A definition proposed by Kaplan & Haenlein (2019) characterises artificial intelligence in terms of a system's ability to interpret external data, learn from it, and use that learning to accomplish specific goals and tasks through flexible adaptation. Dwivedi et al. (2021) describe this definition as "more detailed and perhaps elaborate" than Russel & Norvig's 2016 definition.

The many differing definitions of AI have been critically analysed. During the 2020s AI boom, the term has been utilized as a marketing buzzword to promote products and services that do not use AI.

==== AI system definitions ====
In 2019, the OECD defined the term "AI system", later revising that definition in 2023 to read "a machine-based system that, for explicit or implicit objectives, infers, from the input it receives, how to generate outputs such as predictions, content, recommendations, or decisions that can influence physical or virtual environments. Different AI systems vary in their levels of autonomy and adaptiveness after deployment."

The International Organization for Standardization describes an AI system as an "engineered system that generates outputs such as content, forecasts, recommendations or decisions for a given set of human‑defined objectives" and notes that "AI systems are designed to operate with varying levels of automation" (ISO/IEC 22989:2022).

The EU AI Act defines an AI system as "a machine-based system that is designed to operate with varying levels of autonomy and that may exhibit adaptiveness after deployment, and that, for explicit or implicit objectives, infers, from the input it receives, how to generate outputs such as predictions, content, recommendations, or decisions that can influence physical or virtual environments".

In the United States, non‑binding guidance from the National Institute of Standards and Technology's AI Risk Management Framework offers a definition ("adapted from" the 2019 OECD recommendation and ISO/IEC 22989:2022) of an AI system as "an engineered or machine-based system that can, for a given set of objectives, generate outputs such as predictions, recommendations, or decisions influencing real or virtual environments. AI systems are designed to operate with varying levels of autonomy".

=== Evaluating approaches to AI ===
No established unifying theory or paradigm has guided AI research for most of its history. (Note: Nils Nilsson wrote in 1983: "Simply put, there is wide disagreement in the field about what AI is all about.") The unprecedented success of statistical machine learning in the 2010s eclipsed all other approaches (so much so that some sources, especially in the business world, use the term "artificial intelligence" to mean "machine learning with neural networks"). This approach is mostly sub-symbolic, soft and narrow.

==== Symbolic AI and its limits ====
Symbolic AI (or "GOFAI") simulated the high-level conscious reasoning that people use when they solve puzzles, express legal reasoning and do mathematics. It was highly successful at some "intelligent" tasks such as algebra or IQ tests. In 1976, Newell and Simon proposed the physical symbol systems hypothesis: "A physical symbol system has the necessary and sufficient means of general intelligent action."

However, the symbolic approach failed on many tasks that humans solve easily, such as learning, recognising an object or commonsense reasoning. Moravec's paradox is the discovery that high-level "intelligent" tasks were easy for AI, but low level "instinctive" tasks were extremely difficult. Philosopher Hubert Dreyfus had argued since the 1960s that human expertise depends on embodied, situational know-how that is not representable as explicit symbolic rules rather than conscious symbol manipulation, and on having a "feel" for the situation, rather than explicit symbolic knowledge. Although his arguments had been ridiculed and ignored when they were first presented, eventually, AI research came to agree with him. (Note: Daniel Crevier wrote that "time has proven the accuracy and perceptiveness of some of Dreyfus's comments. Had he formulated them less aggressively, constructive actions they suggested might have been taken much earlier.")

The issue is not resolved: sub-symbolic reasoning can make many of the same inscrutable mistakes that human intuition does, such as algorithmic bias. Critics such as Noam Chomsky argue continuing research into symbolic AI will still be necessary to attain general intelligence, in part because sub-symbolic AI is a move away from explainable AI: it can be difficult or impossible to understand why a modern statistical AI program made a particular decision. The emerging field of neuro-symbolic artificial intelligence attempts to bridge the two approaches.

==== Neat vs. scruffy ====
"Neats" hope that intelligent behaviour is described using simple, elegant principles (such as logic or optimisation). "Scruffies" expect that it necessarily requires solving a large number of unrelated problems. Neats defend their programs with theoretical rigour, scruffies rely mainly on incremental testing to see if they work. This issue was actively discussed in the 1970s and 1980s. The rise of deep learning may represent a shift toward the scruffies.

==== Soft vs. hard computing ====
Finding a provably correct or optimal solution is intractable for many important problems. Soft computing is a set of techniques, including genetic algorithms, fuzzy logic and neural networks, that are tolerant of imprecision, uncertainty, partial truth and approximation. Soft computing was introduced in the late 1980s and most successful AI programs in the 21st century are examples of soft computing with neural networks.

==== Narrow vs. general AI ====
AI researchers are divided as to whether to pursue the goals of artificial general intelligence and superintelligence directly or to solve as many specific problems as possible (narrow AI) in hopes these solutions will lead indirectly to the field's long-term goals. General intelligence is difficult to define and difficult to measure, and modern AI has had more verifiable successes by focusing on specific problems with specific solutions. The sub-field of artificial general intelligence studies this area exclusively.

=== Machine consciousness, sentience, and mind ===
There is no settled consensus in philosophy of mind on whether a machine can have a mind, consciousness or subjective experiences in the same sense that human beings do. This issue considers the internal experiences of the machine, rather than its external behaviour. Mainstream AI research considers this issue irrelevant because it does not affect the goals of the field: to build machines that can solve problems using intelligence. Russell and Norvig add that "[t]he additional project of making a machine conscious in exactly the way humans are is not one that we are equipped to take on." However, the question has become central to the philosophy of mind. It is also typically the central question at issue in artificial intelligence in fiction.

==== Consciousness ====
David Chalmers identified two problems in understanding the mind, which he named the "hard" and "easy" problems of consciousness. The easy problem is understanding how the brain processes signals, makes plans and controls behaviour. The hard problem is explaining how this feels or why it should feel like anything at all, assuming we are right in thinking that it truly does feel like something (Dennett's consciousness illusionism says this is an illusion). While human information processing is easy to explain, human subjective experience is difficult to explain. For example, it is easy to imagine a colour-blind person who has learned to identify which objects in their field of view are red, but it is not clear what would be required for the person to know what red looks like.

==== Computationalism and functionalism ====
Computationalism is the position in the philosophy of mind that the human mind is an information processing system and that thinking is a form of computing. Computationalism argues that the relationship between mind and body is similar or identical to the relationship between software and hardware and thus may be a solution to the mind–body problem. This philosophical position was inspired by the work of AI researchers and cognitive scientists in the 1960s and was originally proposed by philosophers Jerry Fodor and Hilary Putnam.

Philosopher John Searle characterised this position as "strong AI": "The appropriately programmed computer with the right inputs and outputs would thereby have a mind in exactly the same sense human beings have minds." (Note: Searle presented this definition of "Strong AI" in 1999. Searle's original formulation was "The appropriately programmed computer really is a mind, in the sense that computers given the right programs can be literally said to understand and have other cognitive states." Strong AI is defined similarly by Russell and Norvig: "Strong AI – the assertion that machines that do so are actually consciously thinking (as opposed to simulating thinking).") Searle challenges this claim with his Chinese room argument, which attempts to show that even a computer capable of perfectly simulating human behaviour would not have a mind.

==== AI welfare and rights ====
It is difficult or impossible to reliably evaluate whether an advanced AI is sentient (has the ability to feel), and if so, to what degree. But if there is a significant chance that a given machine can feel and suffer, then it may be entitled to certain rights or welfare protection measures, similarly to animals. Sapience (a set of capacities related to high intelligence, such as discernment or self-awareness) may provide another moral basis for AI rights. Robot rights are also sometimes proposed as a practical way to integrate autonomous agents into society.

In 2017, the European Union considered granting "electronic personhood" to some of the most capable AI systems. Similarly to the legal status of companies, it would have conferred rights but also responsibilities. Critics argued in 2018 that granting rights to AI systems would downplay the importance of human rights, and that legislation should focus on user needs rather than speculative futuristic scenarios. They also noted that robots lacked the autonomy to take part in society on their own.

Progress in AI increased interest in the topic. Proponents of AI welfare and rights often argue that AI sentience, if it emerges, would be particularly easy to deny. They warn that this may be a moral blind spot analogous to slavery or factory farming, which could lead to large-scale suffering if sentient AI is created and carelessly exploited.

== Future ==
=== Superintelligence and the singularity ===
A superintelligence is a hypothetical agent that would possess intelligence far surpassing that of the brightest and most gifted human mind. If research into artificial general intelligence produced sufficiently intelligent software, it might be able to reprogram and improve itself. The improved software would be even better at improving itself, leading to what I. J. Good called an "intelligence explosion" and Vernor Vinge called a "singularity".

In Artificial Intelligence: A Modern Approach, Russel and Norvig cast doubt on the possibility of a singularity, arguing that "so far, every technology has followed an S-shaped curve", and that "sometimes it is not possible to keep the growth going."

=== Transhumanism ===
Robot designer Hans Moravec, cyberneticist Kevin Warwick and inventor Ray Kurzweil have predicted that humans and machines may merge in the future into cyborgs that are more capable and powerful than either. This idea, called transhumanism, has roots in the writings of Aldous Huxley and Robert Ettinger.

Edward Fredkin argues that "artificial intelligence is the next step in evolution", an idea first proposed by Samuel Butler's "Darwin among the Machines" as far back as 1863, and expanded upon by George Dyson in his 1998 book Darwin Among the Machines: The Evolution of Global Intelligence.

== In fiction ==
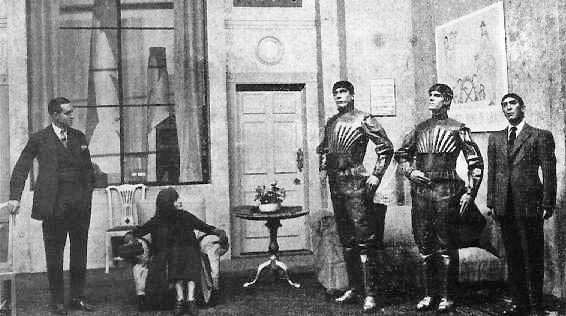
The word "robot" itself was coined by Karel Čapek in his 1921 play R.U.R., the title standing for "Rossum's Universal Robots".

Thought-capable artificial beings have appeared as storytelling devices since antiquity, and have been a persistent theme in science fiction.

A common trope in these works began with Mary Shelley's Frankenstein, where a human creation becomes a threat to its masters. This includes such works as Arthur C. Clarke's and Stanley Kubrick's 2001: A Space Odyssey (both 1968), with HAL 9000, the murderous computer in charge of the Discovery One spaceship, as well as Blade Runner (1982), The Terminator (1984) and The Matrix (1999). In contrast, the rare loyal robots such as Gort from The Day the Earth Stood Still (1951) and Bishop from Aliens (1986) are less prominent in popular culture.

Isaac Asimov introduced the Three Laws of Robotics in many stories, most notably with the "Multivac" super-intelligent computer. Asimov's laws are often brought up during lay discussions of machine ethics; while almost all artificial intelligence researchers are familiar with Asimov's laws through popular culture, they generally consider the laws useless for many reasons, one of which is their ambiguity.

Several works use AI to force us to confront the phenomenological question of what makes us human, showing us artificial beings that have the ability to feel, and thus to suffer. This appears in Karel Čapek's R.U.R., the films A.I. Artificial Intelligence and Ex Machina, as well as the novel Do Androids Dream of Electric Sheep? by Philip K. Dick. Dick considers the idea that our understanding of human subjectivity is altered by technology created with artificial intelligence.

== See also ==
- Artificial consciousness – Hypothetical consciousness in artificial systems
- Artificial intelligence and elections
- Artificial intelligence content detection – Software to detect AI-generated content
- Artificial intelligence in Wikimedia projects – Use of artificial intelligence to develop Wikipedia and other Wikimedia projects
- Association for the Advancement of Artificial Intelligence (AAAI)
- Behavior selection algorithm – Algorithm that selects actions for intelligent agents
- Business process automation – Automation of business processes
- Case-based reasoning – Process of solving new problems based on the solutions of similar past problems
- Computational intelligence – Computer system simulating intelligence
- Digital immortality – Hypothetical concept of storing a personality in digital form
- Emergent algorithm – Algorithm exhibiting emergent behavior
- Female gendering of AI technologies – Gender biases in digital technology
- Glossary of artificial intelligence – List of concepts in artificial intelligence
- Intelligence amplification – Use of information technology to augment human intelligence
- Intelligent agent – Software agent which acts autonomously
- Intelligent automation – Software process that combines robotic process automation and artificial intelligence
- List of artificial intelligence books
- List of artificial intelligence algorithms
- List of artificial intelligence companies
- List of artificial intelligence institutions
- List of artificial intelligence journals
- List of artificial intelligence projects
- List of university artificial intelligence research centers
- Lists of open-source artificial intelligence software
- List of proprietary artificial intelligence software
- List of robotics software
- Mind uploading – Hypothetical process of digitally emulating a brain
- Organoid intelligence – Use of brain cells and brain organoids for intelligent computing
- Outline of deep learning
- Outline of machine learning
- Pseudorandomness – Appearing random but actually being generated by a deterministic, causal process
- Robotic process automation – Form of business process automation technology
- The Last Day – 1967 Welsh science fiction novel
- Wetware computer – Computer composed of organic material
