= David Williamson Shaffer =

American academic (born 1964)

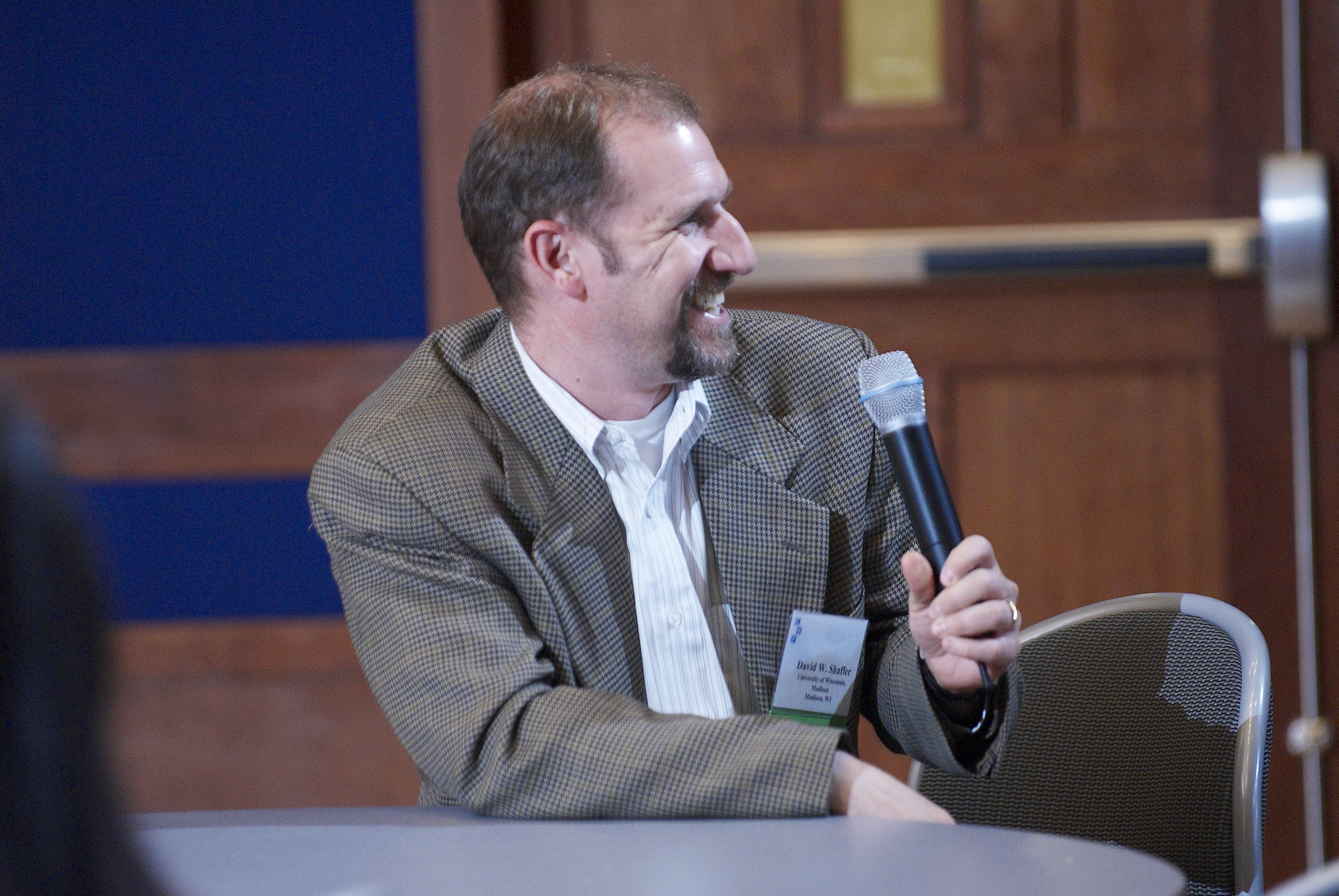
- Shaffer in 2006
- Born: May 10, 1964 (age 62); New York, New York
- Education: Harvard University; MIT
- Known for: Epistemic Frame Theory; Epistemic Frame Games; Epistemic Network Analysis
- Scientific career
- Fields: Learning Sciences; Education; Educational Psychology
- Workplaces: University of Wisconsin-Madison
- Doctoral advisor: Seymour Papert

David Williamson Shaffer (born May 10, 1964 in New York City, New York) is the Vilas Distinguished Achievement Professor of Learning Science at the University of Wisconsin–Madison in the department of Educational Psychology, the Obel Foundation Professor of Learning Analytics at Aalborg University in Copenhagen, a Data Philosopher at the Wisconsin Center for Education Research, and Principal of EFGames, LLC.

== Education and career ==
Shaffer received an A.B. in History and East Asian Studies (1987) from Harvard University and his M.S. (1996) and Ph.D. (1998) in Media Arts and Sciences from MIT. Shaffer was a student of James J. Kaput, Mitchel Resnick, William J. Mitchell and Seymour Papert, who studied with Jean Piaget.

Shaffer began his career as a teacher at The Mountain School, an independent school in Vershire, Vermont. He taught and worked as a teacher-trainer in the US Peace Corps in Nepal from 1989 to 1991 in a secondary-level science and math teacher development program sponsored by the Asian Development Bank.

After completing his studies at MIT, Shaffer taught in the Technology in Education program at the Harvard Graduate School of Education, and conducted research in medical education at Harvard Medical School and Massachusetts General Hospital.

In 2001, Shaffer became an assistant professor in education psychology at the University of Wisconsin–Madison. He was promoted to associate professor in 2006, to full professor in 2008, and became the Vilas Distinguished Achievement Professor of Learning Science in 2016. He has also been the Obel Foundation Professor of Learning Analytics at Aalborg University in Copenhagen since 2016, a principal investigator at the Wisconsin Center for Education Research since 2001, and a faculty affiliate of the Gaylord Nelson Institute for Environmental Studies at the University of Wisconsin–Madison since 2005.

In 2008, Shaffer founded EFGames, LLC, an educational game development and consulting firm.

Shaffer was a Marie Curie Fellow at Utrecht University from 2008 to 2009, and received a Fellowship to the European Institute for Advanced Study at École normale supérieure de Lyon for 2015.

== Theories ==
Shaffer is a scholar in the fields of the Learning Sciences, Education, and Educational Psychology best known for his work on computer games and learning. Shaffer's research was originally based on the development of epistemic games, or games that simulate real-world problem solving.

Based on studies of how people learn to solve complex problems in realistic settings, Shaffer developed epistemic frame theory, which suggests that professional thinking is best understood not in terms of knowledge and skills in a professional domain, but rather as an epistemic frame composed of knowledge, skills, values, and identity linked by a particular professional epistemology—-a way of making decisions and justifying actions. This theory has been tested in a range of professions, including architecture, journalism, urban planning, and engineering.

Building on epistemic frame theory, Epistemic Network Analysis (ENA) is a mathematical technique used to quantify the development of epistemic frames. Based on Social Network Analysis, ENA creates network models of the connections a person or group of people makes among the frame elements (skills, knowledge, values, identities, and epistemologies) of a professional practice.

ENA is an example of quantitative ethnography, a term coined by Shaffer to describe a set of research methods leveraging novel statistical models and data visualization techniques to augment the scale and power of rich qualitative analyses. Originally developed to identify meaningful differences between groups of learners, quantitative ethnographic approaches have also been used to analyze data from other disciplines, such as history and systems engineering.

== Epistemic Games ==
Shaffer has been involved in the creation and study of several epistemic games.

=== Pandora Project ===
Players become high-powered negotiators, deciding the fate of a real medical controversy: the ethics of transplanting organs from animals into humans. Along the way, they learn about biology, international relations, and mediation.

=== Escher's World ===
Players become graphic artists and create an exhibit of mathematical art in the style of M.C. Escher. Based on an architectural design studio, the game helps players learn to think like designers about geometry and graphic art.

=== Journalism.net ===
Players become reporters working for an online news magazine. Working with professional journalists and interviewing community leaders, these young reporters learn about how journalists think about news and its important relationship to the community.

=== Digital Zoo ===
Players become biomechanical engineers. Using Sodaconstructor, a sophisticated physics simulation, they design wire-frame character prototypes for an upcoming animated film. Players meet with clients and engineering experts, and present their work, developing real-world skills while learning concepts in science and engineering.

=== Urban Science ===
Players engage in the professional practices of urban planning and learn how to become ecological thinkers in the process. They work together to tackle the urban issues that face their city, using iPlan, a Geographic Information System (GIS) tool that helps them develop a comprehensive plan for their community.

=== Land Science ===
Land Science extends the game Urban Science. In Land Science, players become interns at the office of a fictitious urban and regional planning firm, Land Management Associates. Players weigh the trade-offs of land use decisions in ecologically-sensitive areas, interact with virtual stakeholders and use iPlan, a custom-designed Geographic Information System, to develop land use plans for local and national sites.

=== Nephrotex ===
Players are welcomed as early career hires into the fictitious company Nephrotex, whose core technology is the ultrafiltration unit, or dialyzer, of a hemodialysis machine. The players' assigned task is to design a next-generation dialyzer that incorporates carbon nanotubes and chemical surfactants into the hollow fibers of the dialyzer unit. The game is intended to teach first-year engineering students design skills.

== Epistemic Network Analysis ==
Epistemic network analysis (ENA) was originally developed as a tool to model connected understanding that characterizes complex learning in communities of practice in terms of epistemic frames. Although originally designed to assess epistemic frames in virtual game environments, ENA is used more generally to quantify the structure of connections that constitute complex thinking as they manifest in discourse, or more generally to quantify and visualize the development of any phenomenon, such as fMRI data on brain activity, that can be characterized by changes in connections over time.

=== Application of ENA to data on learning ===
In ENA, logfiles from learning activities are coded for the presence of key elements in a target domain, such as engineering or journalism. For any two elements of the target domain, the strength of their association in an epistemic network is computed based on the frequency of their co-occurrence the logfile data. The model of linkages between elements over time quantifies the development of a network.

These models can be projected into a high-dimensional space. Trajectories of change over time in networks can be visualized as paths through this space, and differences between networks (including possible convergence towards some ideal configuration) can be measured by calculating the distance between networks. Because changes in network structure are linked to specific points in time, ENA can associate key changes in complex and collaborative thinking with specific activities that learners undertake.

=== Other applications of ENA ===
The ENA toolkit is available online and has been used to model data from a diverse array of domains, including ethnographic data, log files, video game data, classroom teacher discourse, interview transcripts, and neuroscience imaging.

== Selected works ==
- Shaffer, D.W. (2017) Quantitative Ethnography, Madison, WI: Cathcart. ISBN 978-0578191683
- Shaffer, D. W. (2007). How Computer Games Help Children Learn. New York: Palgrave. ISBN 978-0230602526
- Gee, J. P., & Shaffer, D. W. (September/October 2010). Looking Where the Light is Bad: Video Games and the Future of Assessment. Phi Delta Kappa International EDge, 6(1).
- Shaffer, D. W. (2009). Computers and the End of Progressive Education. In David Gibson (Ed.) Digital Simulations for Improving Education:Learning Through Artificial Teaching Environments (pp. 68–85).Hershey, PA: IGI Global.
- Shaffer, D. W. (2009). Wag the Kennel: Games, Frames, and the Problem of Assessment. In R. Fertig (Ed.), Handbook of Research on Effective Electronic Gaming in Education. (pp. 577–592). Hershey, PA: IGI Global.
- Shaffer, D. W., Hatfield, D., Svarovsky, G. N., Nash, P., Nulty, A., Bagley, E., Franke, K., Rupp, A. A., Mislevy, R. (2009). Epistemic Network Analysis: A prototype for 21st Century assessment of learning. The International Journal of Learning and Media. 1(2), 33–53.
