= Papert =

Surname

Papert is a surname. Some notable bearers of the name include:

== People ==
- Ines Papert (born 1974), German ice climber
- Kate Papert (1902–1977), American labor economist, state official
- Seymour Papert (1928–2016), American computer scientist

== Other uses ==
- Papert Koenig Lois, American advertising agency (1960–1969)
- Papert's principle
