= Papert's principle =

Child psychology concept

In child psychology, Papert's principle is often used to explain the results of Jean Piaget's experiments. It is named for Seymour Papert and states that:

Some of the most crucial steps in mental growth are based not simply on acquiring new skills, but on acquiring new administrative ways to use what one already knows.

— Marvin Minsky, The Society of Mind

This explanation of the difference between children by age was initially proposed by Papert in the 1960s. The principle states that the organisation and use of knowledge takes precedence over simple acquisition of knowledge. The most crucial steps in mental growth, as identified by Minsky, take place when a child obtains new administrative skills to utilise pre-existing skills.

== See also ==
- Association
- Attention
- Dissociation
- Child development
- Developmental psychology
- Language development
- Mental development
- Thought
