= Multi-animator project =

Group animation based on a music video

A multi-animator project (MAP) is an animation made by more than one person, usually based around a music video. MAPs are centred around a theme or a fandom, such as Gravity Falls, Undertale, or Doctor Who. MAPs are commonly created on the programming website Scratch and the social media website YouTube. Some MAPs reach tens of thousands to millions of views on YouTube; however, most MAPs are not even completed.

== Creation ==
A MAP is initiated by the "host", who is responsible for recruiting and coordinating the team of animators, choosing the music and setting deadlines. First, the host divides the song into "segments" which each contributor can animate.

The host may create a "MAP call", which is used to recruit animators for the project. Then, animators who want to contribute select their segment and animate it. When each animation is completed, the host combines every segment into a full video.
