= Spertus =

Spertus may refer to:

- Spertus Institute, one of the leading Jewish organizations in Chicago, Illinois, U.S.
- Ellen Spertus, Associate Professor of Computer Science at Mills College and a research scientist at Google
