= Subtext (programming language) =

Programming language

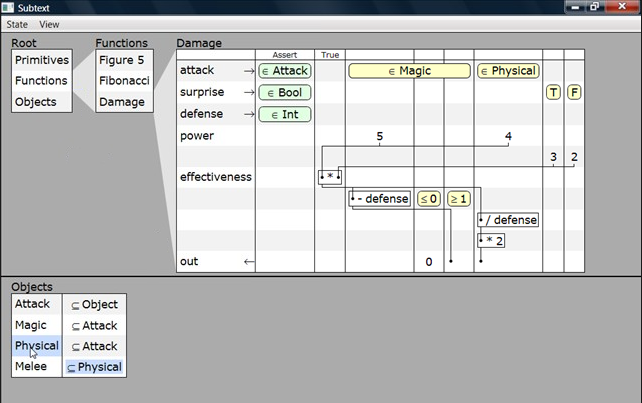
Schematic tables. An alpha build of the Subtext environment, which illustrates the unique "polymorphic conditionals" present in the IDE.

Subtext is a moderately visual programming language and environment, for writing application software. It is an experimental, research attempt to develop a new programming model, called Example Centric Programming, by treating copied blocks as first class prototypes, for program structure. It uses live text, similar to what occurs in spreadsheets as users update cells, for frequent feedback. It is intended to eventually be developed enough to become a practical language for daily use. It is planned to be open software; the license is not yet determined.

Subtext was created by Jonathan Edwards who submitted a paper on the language to OOPSLA. It was accepted as part of the 2005 conference.

== Environment ==
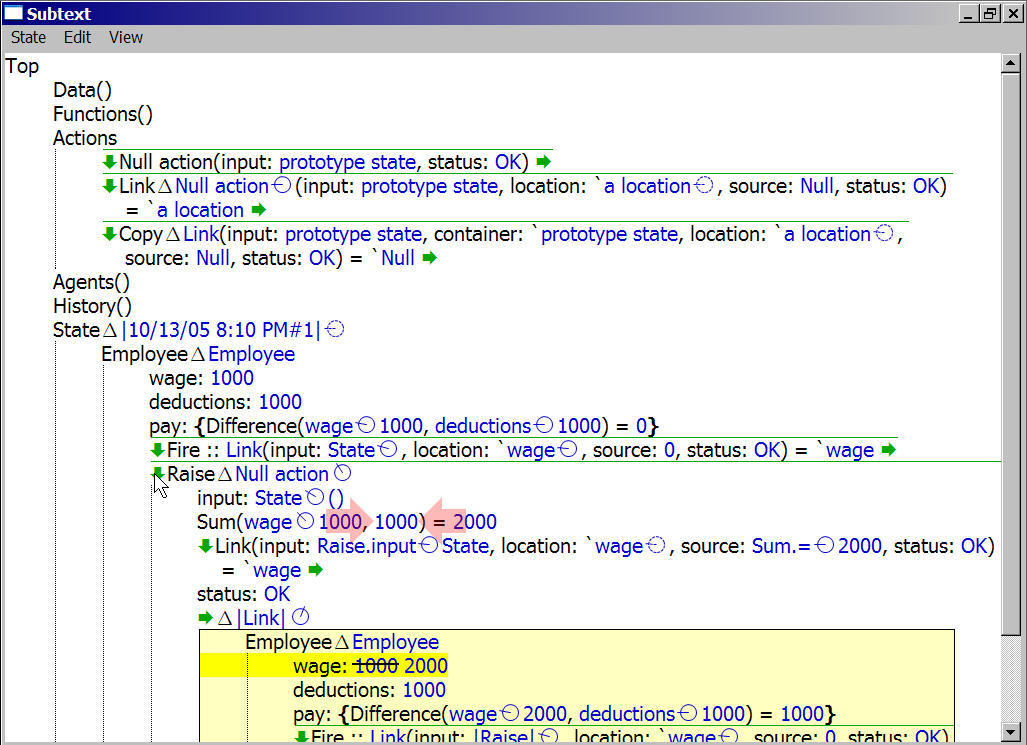
Early build of the Subtext environment with the program's current state visible. The employee data (like "wage") is visibly changed after invoking the "Raise" method by clicking its "invoke arrow", and the hypothetical state (displayed within the Raise method) is also updated.

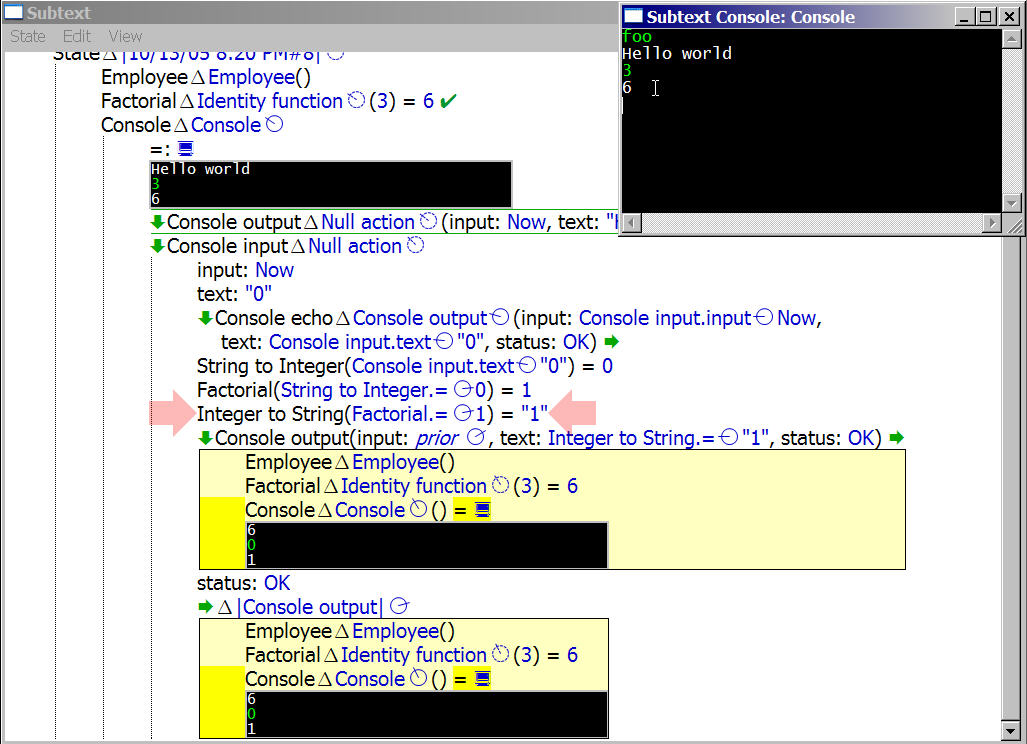
Early build of the Subtext environment with interactive console inputs.

Early video previews of the Subtext environment were released circa 2006, which demonstrated the semantics of Subtext programs, and the close integration with the Subtex environment and runtime.

Subtext programs are declared and manipulated (or mutated) by adding and linking elements of various types to a syntax tree, and entering in values or names as necessary, as opposed to typing out textual programs. Due to the design of the Subtext language and environment, there is no distinction between a program's representation and its execution. Like spreadsheets, Subtext programs are live executions within an environment and runtime, and programming is direct manipulation of these executions via a graphical environment. Unlike typical functional programming languages, Subtext has simple semantics and is easily applicable to reactive systems that require mutable state, I/O, and concurrency, under a model known as "Reactive Programming". Console input ("invocations") can be utilized via data flow within a Subtext program, allowing users to manipulate values interactively.

== Coherence ==
A continuation and subset of the Subtext language using other principles, is Coherence, an experimental programming language and environment, which uses a new model of change-driven computation called "Coherent reaction", to coordinate the effects and side-effects of programs interactively as they are being developed. The language is specialized for interactive application software, and is being designed by the creator of Subtext, Jonathan Edwards, who reports upon its development by publishing white papers.

Side effects are both the essence and bane of imperative programming. The programmer must carefully coordinate actions to manage their side effects upon each other. Such coordination is complex, error-prone, and fragile. Coherent reaction is a new model of change-driven computation that coordinates effects automatically. Automatically coordinating actions lets the programmer express what to do, not when to do it.

— Jonathan Edwards, Coherent Reaction, MIT CSAIL

Logo for the Coherence programming language

State changes trigger events called reactions, that in turn change other states. A coherent execution order is one in which each reaction executes before any others that are affected by its changes. A coherent order is discovered iteratively by detecting incoherencies as they occur and backtracking their effects. The fundamental building block of Coherence is the dynamically typed mutable tree. The fundamental abstraction mechanism is the virtual tree, whose value is lazily computed, and whose behavior is generated by coherent reactions.
