= ScratchJr =

Visual programming language

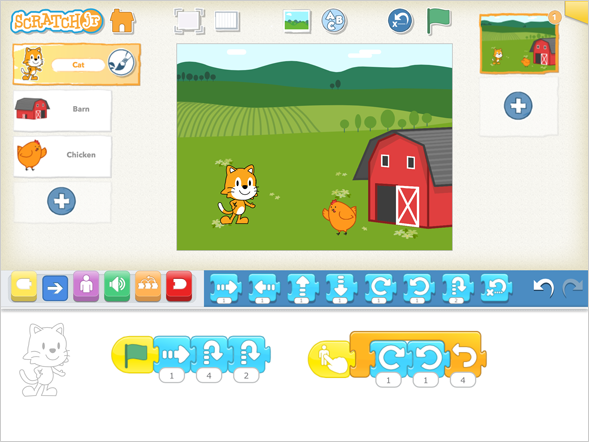
- Developer: MIT Media Lab
- First appeared: July 2014; 12 years ago
- OS: Android, iOS and ChromeOS
- Filename extensions: .sjr
- Website: www.scratchjr.org

ScratchJr is a visual programming language designed to introduce programming skills to children ages 5–7. The app is considered an introductory programming language. It is available as a free app for iOS, Android and Chromebook.

ScratchJr is a derivative of the Scratch language, which has been used by over 10 million people worldwide. Programming in Scratch requires basic reading skills, however, so the creators saw a need for another language which would provide a simplified way to learn programming at a younger age and without any reading or mathematics required.

== History ==
ScratchJr was developed by a collaborative team including Marina Umaschi Bers at Tufts University, Mitchel Resnick at the MIT Media Lab, and Paula Bonta and Brian Silverman at the Playful Invention Company. The project was given a $1.3 million grant from the National Science Foundation and raised additional funds on the Kickstarter platform. The initial release was launched in July 2014 for iPad; an Android version was released in March 2015 and a Chromebook app followed in March 2016. There is also a version called PBS Kids ScratchJr, which was released in partnership with PBS Kids in 2015. This version has sprites and backgrounds drawn from popular children's animated series such as Nature Cat and Wild Kratts.

== User interface ==
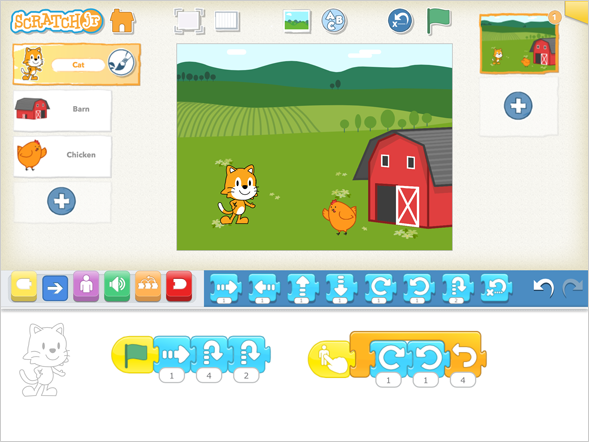
Interface of the editor

Children create code in objects called sprites, which can be characters or other objects. ScratchJr comes with a library of sprites, and sprites can be edited or new ones created using the paint editor.

The paint editor allows painting in different colours with different thicknesses. Users can draw shapes and erase paint.

Code is created by dragging blocks into a coding area and snapping them together. All the blocks are completely icon-based (no text other than for values) which is how children can use this language before they can read. Blocks are connected from left to right, like words, contradicting the top-to-bottom connections that the original Scratch language uses. The main coding area is displayed at the bottom of the screen, with the stage in the centre, the scene on the right, and the sprites on the left. Sprites are unique to each scene.

The user interface is much simpler than that of Scratch. Both the number of categories of programming blocks and the number of blocks within each category have been reduced, so that only most basic ones were retained.

Category	Attributes
Events	Starts scripts and sends messages to other scripts
Motion	Moves sprites and changes angles
Looks	Controls visibility, costumes, and bubble speech output
Sound	Plays a "pop" sound or a recorded sound
Control	Repeats a part of script a specified number of times
Endings	Ends, infinitely repeats, and goes to the specified page of the project

In addition to sprites, children can add backgrounds to projects to create a setting and atmosphere. Each background is treated like a page in a book, and has its own set of sprites. A project can have a maximum of four backgrounds.

== Use in school settings ==
ScratchJr is an app for developing computational thinking skills in elementary classrooms, especially in settings with pre-reading students such as Pre-K to 2nd grade (approximately aged 5-7 years old).

It is used in a plethora of schools including many classrooms across Massachusetts. For instance, it is utilized by Kindergarten classrooms at the Eliot-Pearson Children's School in Medford, affiliated with the Tufts University, and in the Jewish Community Day School in Watertown, Boston. Beyond classroom use, the platform is also utilized as a bridge for transitional learning, helping students move from basic logic games to creative algorithm building through structured project workflows.

== Languages ==
ScratchJr is available in Catalan, Chinese, Dutch, Danish, English, French, German, Italian, Japanese, Norwegian, Polish, Portuguese, Brazilian Portuguese, Spanish, Swedish, Thai, Turkish and Welsh.
