= Makeblock =

Chinese technology company

Makeblock Co. Ltd.
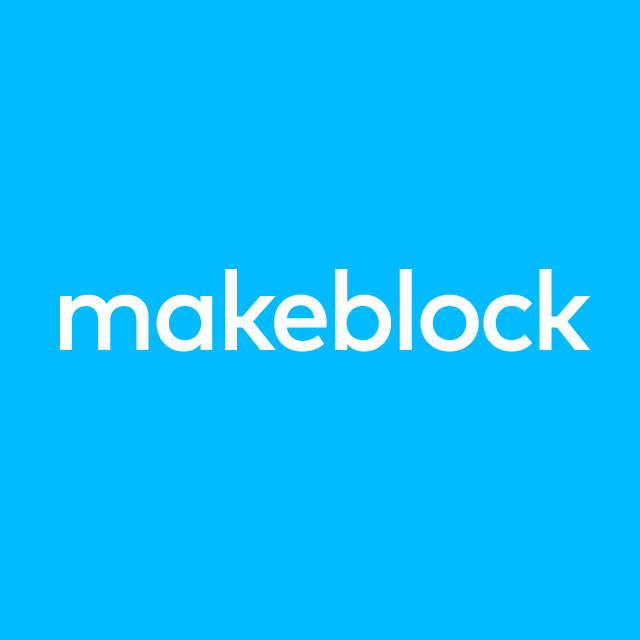
- Type: Private
- Industry: Robotics, education
- Founded: 2012; 14 years ago
- Founders: Jasen Wang
- Headquarters: Nanshan iPark; Shenzhen, China
- Area served: Worldwide
- Website: www.makeblock.com www.mblock.cc

Makeblock (Chinese: 童心制物) is a private Chinese technology company with headquarters in Shenzhen, China. It develops Arduino-based hardware, robotics hardware, and Scratch-based software for the purpose of providing educational tools for learning. This includes programming, engineering and mathematics through the use of robotics.

Makeblock's products are sold in more than 140 countries and have over 10 million users in 20,000 schools worldwide. Roughly 70 percent of Makeblock's sales occur outside of China, with the United States being the largest market.

== Founder & CEO ==
Jasen Wang (Wang Jianjun - 王建军), born in 1985 at Anhui, China, says that he grew up as an "ordinary and poor child". He earned his master's degree in Aircraft Design at Northwestern Polytechnical University in 2010, while tinkering with robotics on the side. Wang spent a year in the workforce before founding Makeblock in 2012.

Wang remains a product manager at the company. In 2013, Forbes China ranked Wang as one of the top 30 entrepreneurs under the age of 30.

After the founding of Makeblock in March 2012, $23,000 was raised in a round of funding from HAX. The company received international coverage when it launched a robotics construction platform called Makeblock in December of the same year.

== History ==
=== 2013 ===
Makeblock launched a crowdfunding project on Kickstarter, becoming the first-ever Chinese entity to do so.

=== 2015 ===
The first launch of mBot and mDrawbot occurred in April. By December, Makeblock's products had been sold in over 80 countries, and the brand had partnered with over 1,000 educational institutions.

=== 2016 ===
The first launch of mBot Ranger took place in March. In May, Makeblock became the exclusive robotics building platform of the RoPorter competition at The Washington Post's Transformers event.

The first real experience store opened in Shenzhen in June, marking the company's first entry into the consumer mass market. At this stage, Makeblock products had been sold in over 140 countries and utilized in more than 20,000 schools.

Airblock was launched in October, followed by the release of mBlock in November.

=== 2017 ===
Makeblock Neuron was launched in March 2017. Shortly afterwards, the product won an array of internationally recognized awards including the German Red Dot, American ISDA IDEA, Good Design Award (Japan) and the South Korean K-Design Award.

MakeX – a Chinese national robotics challenge for teenagers was launched in May.

In July, a partnership with SoftBank Group heralded an official entry into the Japanese market. This was followed by the set up of subsidiaries in the U.S., Europe, Hong Kong and Japan in August.

Codey Rocky was released in November. By December, the number of global Makeblock users surpassed 4.5 million.

=== 2018 ===
Makeblock raised US$44 million in Series C round with a $367 million valuation. The round was led by the China International Capital Corporation (CICC) Alpha, a subsidiary of the CICC direct investment platform.

== Hardware ==
=== STEAM Kits ===
==== Codey Rocky ====
Codey Rocky is a robot aimed to helping children learn the basics of coding and AI technologies.

It is composed of two detachable parts. Codey is a programmable controller holding more than 10 electronic modules. Rocky is a vehicle that can transport Codey. It can avoid obstacles, recognize colors and follow lines.

Codey Rocky is programmable with mBlock 5 and with its use, users can better understand Internet of things (IoT) technologies.

==== Makeblock Neuron ====
Makeblock Neuron is a programmable platform of more than 30 electronic building blocks. This product is targeted towards children and has color-coded blocks aimed at easier understanding.

Each of the blocks has various built-in features and can interact with each other. The kit also has IoT capability.

==== Airblock ====
A winner of four international design awards, the Airblock is a seven-module programmable flying robot. Magnetic connectors allow the drone to be assembled in different ways. It can be controlled using Makeblock's app.

==== mBot Series ====
- MBot

Entry-level educational robotic kits

MBot is a STEAM education robot for beginners. It is a teaching and learning robot designed to teach programming. Children can build a robot from scratch and learn about a variety of robotic machinery and electronic parts. It also teaches the fundamentals of block-based programming, and helps children to develop their logical thinking and design skills.

- MBot Ranger

Multiform land explorer

Part of the MBot series, the Ranger is aimed at users aged 8 and up. This robot kit consists of three pre-set construction forms which can be expanded with ten expansion interfaces.

- Ultimate 2.0

10-in-1 programmable robot kit

The most complex robot of the mBot series is aimed at users aged 12 and up. It includes an assembly guide of 10 designs that can be customized and adjusted. The kit contains more than 160 mechanical parts and modules, including Makeblock's MegaPi mainboard and is compatible with Arduino and Raspberry Pi. Along with Makeblock's block-based programming, Arduino IDE, Node.js and Python languages are supported. There are also add-on packs.

==== mTiny ====
mTiny is an early education robot for children. Its Tap Pen Controller is a coding tool that exercises children's logical thinking and problem-solving abilities. It brings computer programming into children's lives, using coding cards and various themed map blocks to guide the child in exploring, perceiving, and creating through interactive, stimulating, games. The continuously updated mTiny toolkit also fosters children's interest in learning math, English, music, and other subjects.

==== Makeblock Halocode ====
Wireless single-board computer

Makeblock Halocode is a single board computer with built-in Wi-Fi. Designed for programming education, its design integrates a broad selection of electronic modules. Pairing with block-based programming software mBlock, Halocode offers opportunities to experience AI and IoT applications.

=== STEAM pro ===
==== Laserbox ====
Designed for education and creation, Laserbox re-imagines and redefines laser operating performance by the use of a high-resolution, ultra-wide-angle camera together with an AI visual algorithm. The machine can auto-identify any official material and then set up the cutting-engraving parameters accordingly.

==== mBuild ====
mBuild is the new series of electronic modules. It includes over 60 types of modules, supports infinite combinations, and can be used offline without further programming. Supported by both mBlock and the Mu Python editor, mBuild can be used to create interesting projects for beginners through to professionals. It facilitates learning the basics of programming, developing advanced projects, teaching AI and IoT, joining robotics competitions and much more.

==== Makerspace ====
Makerspace is a programmable building block platform that encompasses electronic modules, structural parts, motors and actuators, and transmission and motion parts for gadget building. Teachers can get customized Makerspace proposals for specific curriculum needs. Coupled with Scratch or text-based coding in mBlock, Makerspace helps students participate in global robotic events like MakeX.

=== mBlock 3 ===
mBlock 3 is a block-based programming software based on Scratch 2.0. It interacts with Makeblock controller boards and other Arduino-based hardware, allowing users to create interactive hardware applications. The block-based code can be converted to Arduino C and supports various operating systems including macOS, Windows, Linux, and Chromebook.

=== mBlock Blockly ===
mBlock Blockly allows users to learn about programming through courses designed as levels of a game. The visual programming language taught is specifically created for Makeblock's robots; the courses were designed by education professionals.

=== Neuron App ===
The Neuron App is a flow-based programming application with IoT support. It can control over 30 electronic modules.

== MakeX robotic competition ==
MakeX is a robotics competition platform that promotes multidisciplinary learning within the fields of science and technology. It aims to promote STEAM education through Robotics Competition, STEAM Carnival, etc.

The MakeX Robotics Competition is a robotics competition organised by MakeX. It involves young people in Science, Technology, Engineering, Art, and Mathematics (STEAM).

== STEAM education ==
STEAM education is a learning movement that branched out of the STEM learning concept. Education professionals felt that STEM, on its own, missed critical attributes that are thought to be necessary for individuals to truly prosper in a rapidly changing modern society. STEAM encompasses the areas of Science and Technology, Engineering, the Arts, along with Mathematics and encourages a merge of these fields in an attempt to suit the learning style of every type of student.

Makeblock describes itself as a proponent of STEAM and focuses on providing hardware and software products that aim to allow students to engage in practical, hands-on learning rather than the traditional main focus on theoretical knowledge.

== Books ==
- Robótica Educativa con mBot y Arduino, Ernesto Martínez de Carvajal Hedrich, (2017), ISBN 978-84-697-4932-6
- Robótica Educativa con Ranger y Arduino, Ernesto Martínez de Carvajal Hedrich, (2017), ISBN 978-84-697-7170-9
- Domótica fácil con Makeblock, Ernesto Martínez de Carvajal Hedrich, (2018), ISBN 978-84-090-2375-2
- Robótica Educativa con Neuron de Makeblock - 80 Proyectos STEAM, Ernesto Martínez de Carvajal Hedrich, (2018), ISBN 978-84-090-4696-6
- Robótica Educativa con Codey Rocky de Makeblock, Ernesto Martínez de Carvajal Hedrich, (2018), ISBN 978-84-090-6752-7
- Robótica Educativa con Halocode de Makeblock, Ernesto Martínez de Carvajal Hedrich, (2019), ISBN 978-84-090-9248-2
- Robótica Educativa con mBot2 Neo, Ernesto Martínez de Carvajal Hedrich, (2019), ISBN 978-84-095-4017-4
- Robótica Educativa con CyberPi, Ernesto Martínez de Carvajal Hedrich, (2019), ISBN 978-84-095-9961-5
