= Turtlestitch =

Embroidery platform

TurtleStitch
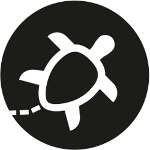
- Paradigm: Object-oriented, educational, event-driven
- Designed by: Andrea Mayr-Stalder (project leader)
- Developer: Michael Aschauer
- First appeared: 2015; 10 years ago
- Stable release: 2.7.18 / July 18, 2024; 13 months ago
- Typing discipline: Dynamic
- Implementation language: JavaScript (Snap!)
- OS: Cross-platform
- License: AGPL
- Filename extensions: .xml (Snap!), embroidery formats: Melco/EXP and Tajima/DST
- Website: www.turtlestitch.org

Influenced by
- Snap!, Scratch, Logo, maker culture

Influenced
- Catrobat Embroidery Designer

Turtlestitch (stylized as TurtleStitch) is a free and open source platform (or web application) for generating and sharing patterns for embroidery machines. Turtlestitch is derived from educational programming languages such as Logo, Scratch and Snap! using the same jigsaw style programming paradigm which offers simplicity suitable for novices but has powerful features, described as ‘low threshold, high ceiling’ by Seymour Papert. Its microworld is a turtle representing the needle of a programmable embroidery machine. Turtlestitch can be used for creating novel patterns for embroidery, combining the abstract logic of computing and the physical materiality of textiles. Its primary use is educational, as it offers a way of introducing programming to audiences with diverse interests. A growing gallery of open source embroidery designs enables community-based collaboration and shared learning. In 2017, Turtlestitch received the award for the best Open Educational Resource in the German-speaking countries.

== Educational approach ==
Embroidery is graphically similar to line drawing and Turtlestitch builds on the concept of Turtle Geometry and the constructionist approach developed by Seymor Papert and Cynthia Solomon at MIT which first informed the Logo and later the Scratch programming languages. Turtlestitch is an active member of the global Scratch community. It updates this approach by bringing it to the Maker Culture (Maker Movement), which combines computing and physical creation.

Turtlestitch's approach does not focus on solving pre-existing problems, but on developing free creativity in programming and designing. Users can approach this field either from the side of code or from the side of textile design, thus speaking to diverse audiences. The shared open-source designs allows for community peer-learning.

A global community is actively using Turtlestitch in formal and informal educational contexts. Cynthia Solomon, involved since the 1960s in developing the constructionist approach described above, has been working (with the late Suzan Klimczak) to develop a Turtlestitch collaborative community, named Tea & TurtleStitchers, based on a 24-week Sunday morning online workshop with participants from all over the world.

== Technical infrastructure ==
Turtlestitch, with Michael Aschauer as lead developer, builds upon Snap! developed by Jens Mönig und Brian Harvey. Snap! is a free open-source blocks-based graphical language implemented in JavaScript and actively maintained by UC Berkeley. Turtlestitch's community website is based on Beetle Cloud by Bernat Romagosa, a member of the Snap! development team at SAP, who partners with UCB in the development of Snap!.

The generated patterns can be exported as an embroidery file (Melco/EXP and Tajima/DST are supported) or SVG vector graphic.

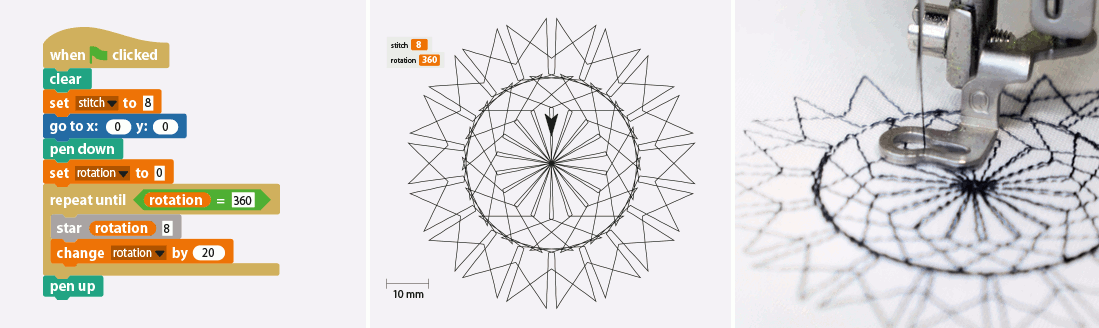
Turtlestitch embroidery design: as code blocks, as drawing (on screen) and as textile embroidery

== Project history ==
The project was initiated by Andrea Mayr-Stalder as a collaboration with the fashion designer Dominique Raffa (aka Raphaela Grundnigg) in 2008 in Vienna and used in numerous artistic projects subsequently.

In 2014, Turtlestitch was relaunched by Andrea Mayr-Stalder with a focus on an educational approach.

In 2025, TurtleStitch10, a conference to celebrate the 10th anniversary of the public release, held in Tilburg, NL, July 18-20.

=== Funding and institutional support ===
2014, 2016 & 2024: funded by netidee.at

2018: Kickstarter campaign

2021: European Union's Horizon2020 research and innovation programme

Turtlestitch is hosted by OSEDA.org (Association for Development of Open Source Software in Education, Design and Art, Vienna) in collaboration with the Vienna University Children's Office.

=== Main software releases ===
01/2015: initial version Turtlestitch 1.0

07/2017: Version 2.0 BDX (Bordeaux)

04/2019: Version 2.5 (The Whizzy Needle)

06/2020: Version 2.6 (Berkley Beaver)

08/2022: Version 2.7.7 (Heidelberg Hedgehog)

07/2024: Version 2.7.18 (Funny Fish)

Upcoming: Version 3.0

== Derivatives ==
In 2018, the project Catrobat Embroidery Designer translated the Turtlestitch framework to mobile phones.

in 2021, the project "Turtlestitchkomplott" started to use Turtlestitch with plotters, instead of embroidery machines.
