= CiMPLE =

Visual programming language

CiMPLE is a visual programming language that tries to visually mimic procedural languages like C/C++. Created by robo.in, a venture by Indian Institute of Technology Bombay alumni, using C++ on a Qt 4.+ cross-platform application framework, CiMPLE was awarded by Nokia as the First Qt/C++ Ambassador Application. Motivation to create CiMPLE was to help do away for rote memorization of language syntax while programming a robotic kit.
