= Flowcode =

Microsoft Windows-based development environment

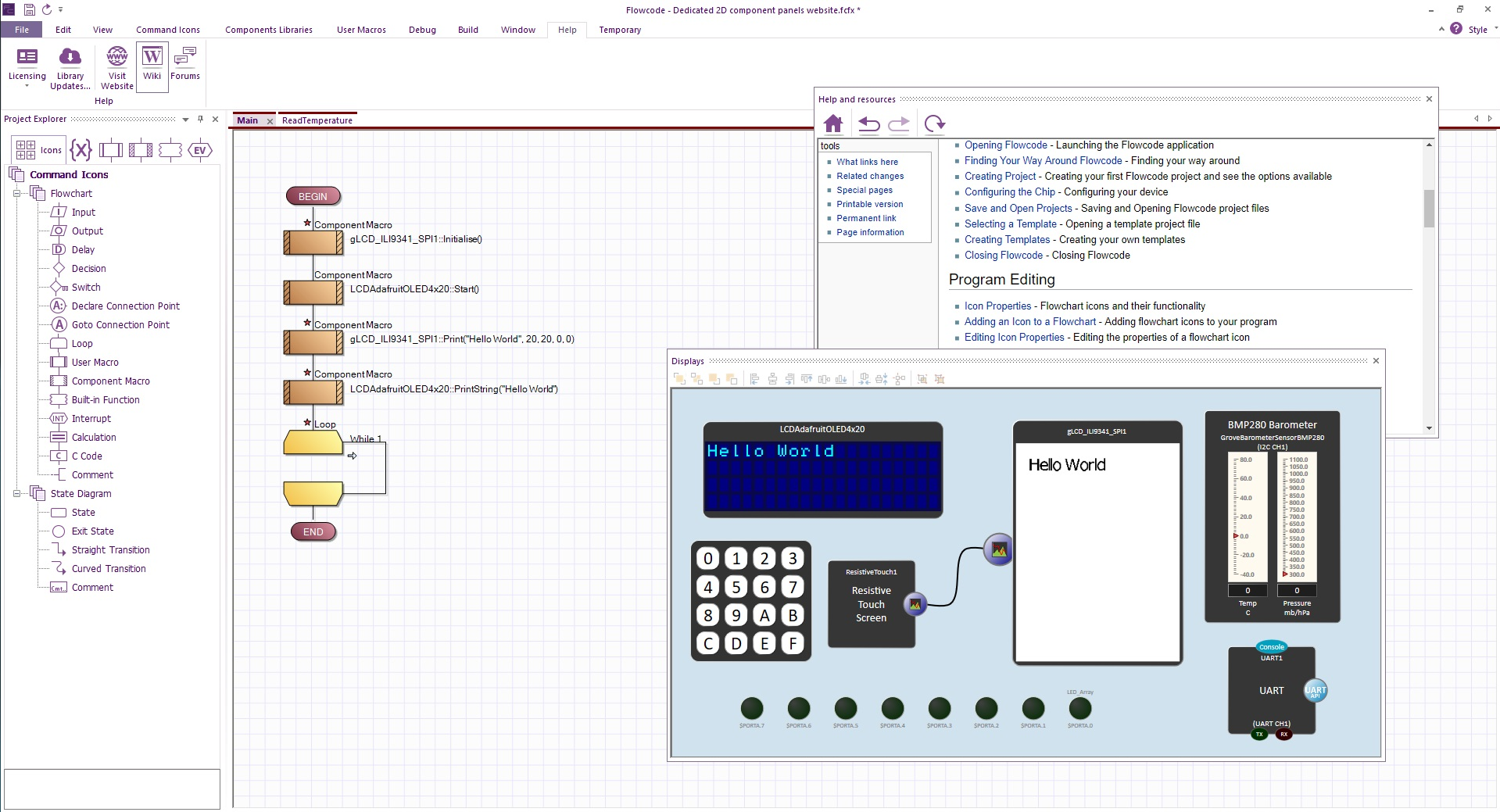
- Flowcode 10 Screenshot
- Developer: Matrix TSL
- Stable release: 10.0 / 25 January 2023; 3 years ago
- Written in: C++
- Operating system: Microsoft Windows
- Available in: English, French, German, Spanish
- Type: Computer programming tool
- License: Proprietary EULA
- Website: www.flowcode.co.uk

Flowcode is a development environment commercially produced by Matrix TSL for programming embedded devices based on PIC, AVR (including Arduino), ESP32, Raspberry Pi and RP2040 and ARM technologies using graphical programming styles (such as flowcharts) and imperative programming styles (through C, State Machines and Pseudocode). It is currently in its eleventh revision.

Flowcode is dedicated to simplifying complex functionality such as Bluetooth, Mobile Phones Communications, USB communications etc. by using pre-developed dedicated open source component libraries of functions. This is achieved by dragging virtual representations of hardware onto a visual panel, providing access to associated libraries. Flowcode is therefore ideal for speeding up software development times and allowing those with little programming experience to get started and help with projects. This makes it appropriate for the formal teaching of principles of programming microcontrollers.

Flowcode allows the user to develop and view their program using four different visual modes. These are the Flowchart view, the Blocks view (a graphical programming paradigm inspired by Blockly), the C code view and the Pseudocode view. There is also a fifth state machine way of entering code.

Flowcode also has a mode named App Developer which is capable of creating Windows based applications via a runtime executable. This allows the software to also create applications for testing or interacting with the embedded system.

Flowcode also has compatibility with Solidworks.
