= Pencil Code (programming language) =

Pencil Code is an educational programming language and website. It allows programming using Scratch-style block coding or CoffeeScript. Code runs directly in the web browser and can be shared with others. The language centers on a model of a pencil programmatically drawing on a 2-dimensional screen, with the pencil cursor visually depicted as a turtle.

A 2019 study by Deng et al. in an eight-week teaching intervention comparing text-based and block-based environments found that students learning in a mixed environment had improved confidence and computational thinking.

== History ==
Pencil Code was created by David Bau and his son in 2013. It was inspired by Logo, the 1967 programming language for drawing on a screen using a Lisp-like programming language. Google has funded improvements to Pencil Code via Google Summer of Code projects.
