= WireFusion =

3D graphics tool

- Developer: Demicron
- Stable release: 5.0.26 / November 2008
- Operating system: Mac OS X, Microsoft Windows, Linux
- Type: 3D computer graphics software
- License: Proprietary
- Website: www.demicron.com/wirefusion/

Demicron WireFusion an authoring tool for creating interactive Web3D presentations. A typical work flow consists of loading a 3D model, configuring/optimizing the 3D model and lastly adding widgets and logic to the presentation. The 3D model is created in a 3D modeling program, like 3DS Max, Maya or any other 3D modeling program that can export as X3D or VRML. The resulting presentations can run in browsers supporting Java 1.1+.

It is developed by Demicron AB, based in Solna, Sweden.

== History ==
WireFusion 1.0 was released in 2000. This release was intended to be an alternative to Flash, for creating 2D animations and also interactive 3D graphics. The latter required a plug-in for WireFusion, WF-3D. With the release of WireFusion 2.0, no plug-in was needed to create 3D presentations. With the releases that followed, the focus was shifted more and more towards the creation of 3D presentations. Today, WireFusion is to be considered a pure 3D presentation authoring tool.

Demicron Reveals OS X Version of WireFusion 5

== Key application features ==
- Imports 3D models specified in X3D and VRML Format
- Supports pure Java software rendering or OpenGL rendering using JOGL
- Full scene anti-aliasing

== Supported operating systems ==
- Authoring tool runs on any platform supporting Java 1.6+
- Player runs on any platform supporting Java 1.1+
