= Snap! (programming language) =

Block-based programming language

- Paradigm: object-oriented, educational, event-driven
- Designed by: Brian Harvey and Jens Mönig
- Developer: Jens Mönig
- First appeared: 2011; 15 years ago
- Stable release: 11.0.8 / May 5, 2025; 17 months ago
- Typing discipline: dynamic
- Implementation language: Morphic.js (written in JavaScript); (Note: BYOB was written in Squeak.)
- OS: Cross-platform
- License: AGPL
- Filename extensions: .xml (Snap!)
- Website: snap.berkeley.edu

Influenced by
- Scratch, Scheme, Logo, Smalltalk, APL

Influenced
- Scratch, BeetleBlocks, NetsBlox, Dragme IDE, Turtlestitch

Snap! (formerly Build Your Own Blocks) is a free block-based educational graphical programming language and online community. Snap allows students to explore, create, and remix interactive animations, games, stories, and more, while learning about mathematical and computational ideas. The Snap! editor, and programs created in it, are web applications that run in the browser without requiring installation. (Note: BYOB, Snap!'s predecessor, was a modification of Scratch and could export projects as Windows executables.) It is built on top of Morphic.js, a Morphic GUI, written by Jens Mönig as 'middle layer' between Snap! itself and 'bare' JavaScript.

== User interface ==
In Snap!, the screen is organized in three resizable columns containing five regions: the block group selector (top of left column), the blocks palette (left column), the main area (middle column), and the stage area (top of right column) with the sprite selector (also called the sprite corral) showing sprite thumbnails below it. (Note: The way pre-2.0 Scratch version's screen was organized.)

In the interactively resizable stage area are shown the graphical results of the scripts running in the script area and/or interactively double-clicked individual blocks in any palette. Individual blocks can be dragged from the palette onto the scripts area to be associated with the selected sprite.

Category	Notes	Category	Notes
Motion	Moves and turns sprites	Control	If statements, events, loop structures, scenes, OOP, metaprogramming
Looks	Controls visibility, costumes, and output	Sensing	All sprite hit detection and user input
Sound	Plays audio files and programmable sequenced audio	Operators	Mathematical, text, and Boolean operators; lambda
Pen	Write, draw, or stamp on stage	Variables	Variables, lists, including lists of lists, lists of blocks, etc.

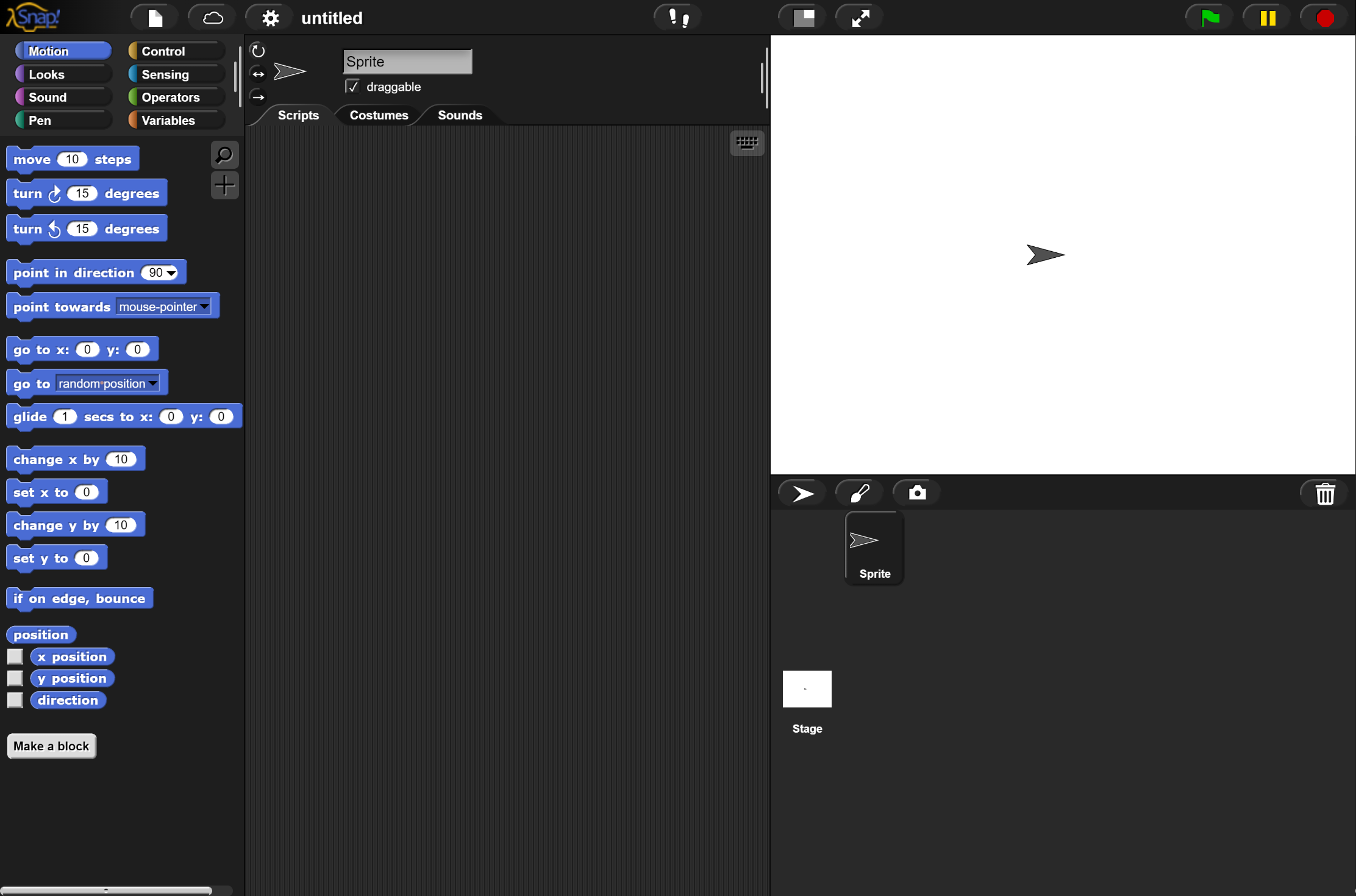
Three resizable columns, containing five regions, in Snap!'s IDE at startup

Snap!'s blocks are divided into eight groups: Motion, Looks, Sound, Pen, Control, Sensing, Operators, and Variables. The layout of these groups in the block group selector is shown in the table below.

The central area can show scripts, costumes/backdrops, or sounds associated with the selected sprite. What that area shows depends on the selected tab.

== Mascot ==

Alonzo, the mascot of Snap!, is a modified version of Gobo from Scratch, with permission from the Scratch Team. He is named after Alonzo Church, the inventor of lambda calculus, and his hair is based on the Greek letter lambda.

== Special-purpose blocks (libraries) ==
Extended sets of blocks can be found in Snap! libraries, such as the 'streams' library that enables one to make the complete, infinite Fibonacci sequence, for example, using the special blocks ('stream', 'show stream', 'tail of stream', and 'map ( ) over stream' block) from the library.

Many other libraries are available, such as the 'list utilities' library, the 'words, sentences' library, the 'iterations' library, the 'animation' library, the 'frequency distribution' library, the 'audio computation' library, the 'bar charts' library, the 'world map' library, the 'colors and crayons' library, the 'strings and multi-line input' library, the 'parallelization' library, etc. for other special purposes.

== Limitations ==
Limitations include:

- No native cloud variables (can be created using extensions)
- 10 megabyte file cap for uploading (Snap! Cloud only)
- The Javascript block is opt-in, and can only be run in the editor.

== History ==
The web-based Snap! and older desktop-based BYOB were both developed by Jens Mönig for Windows, OS X and Linux with design ideas and documentation provided by Brian Harvey from University of California, Berkeley and have been used to teach "The Beauty and Joy of Computing" introductory course in computer science (CS) for non-CS-major students. Jens was a member of the Scratch Team before creating Snap!. BYOB is still available for downloading.

== License ==
The source code of Snap! is released under the GNU Affero General Public License version 3 (AGPLv3) license and is hosted on GitHub. The earlier, desktop-based 3.x version's code is available under a license that allows modification for only non-commercial uses and can be downloaded from the UC Berkeley website or CNET's download.com and TechTracker download page.

== Platforms ==
Snap! runs on the major web-browsers on Windows, iOS, MacOS and Linux devices.

Supported web-browsers include:

- Firefox
- Chrome (and most Chromium based browsers)
- Opera GX
- Microsoft Edge
- Safari

== Implementation ==
Snap! is built on top of Morphic.js, a Morphic GUI, which serves as 'middle layer' between Snap! itself and 'bare' JavaScript. It uses an HTML5 Canvas application programming interface (API).

All things visible in Snap! are morphs themselves, i.e. all buttons, sliders, dialog boxes, menus, entry fields, text rendering, blinking cursors etc. are created with morphic.js rather than using HTML DOM elements. Snap! caches the shapes of sprites so the sprite doesn't have to be re-drawn onto a new Canvas element every time the mouse moves over its bounding box. It does not cache blocks, however. Instead it manages the insides of C-shaped blocks through the morphic "holes" mechanism.

All user interaction is triggered by events, which are passed on from the root element "the world" to its submorphs. Dropping a morph causes it to become embedded in a new 'owner' ('parent') morph. In Morphic the preferred way to run an animation is to register it with the World by adding it to the World's animation queue. The World steps each registered animation once per display cycle independently of the Morphic stepping mechanism.

== Recognition ==
Snap! has been recognized by the Logo Foundation, and reviewed in an online magazine for programmers. As of December 2014, 100 New York City (NYC) high schools introduced University of California, Berkeley's “Beauty and Joy of Computing” as a new AP Computer Science Principles course, using Snap!. Jens and Brian received the National Technology Leadership Summit (NTLS) 2020 Educational Leadership Award for lifetime achievement based in part on Snap!.
