= MST Workshop =

The MST Workshop (short for Math Science and Technology Workshop) is an interactive computer programming language. It has hundreds of components that can be dragged on to the workspace and connected by wires or snapping them together. The workspace immediately solves the equations created and displays the results. MST Workshop is useful for creating animation in 2D and 3D.

MST Workshop uses components to process data. These components are connected when their terminals touch or when a virtual wire is connected between them. The interactive nature becomes apparent when components are connected. Components calculate in real time. Certain components that require a time frame can be started and stopped by buttons in the toolbar. Examples of time dependent components are the timer, oneshot, and the integration-over-time component.
