= Ellen Spertus =

American computer scientist

Professor Ellen Spertus Ph.D.
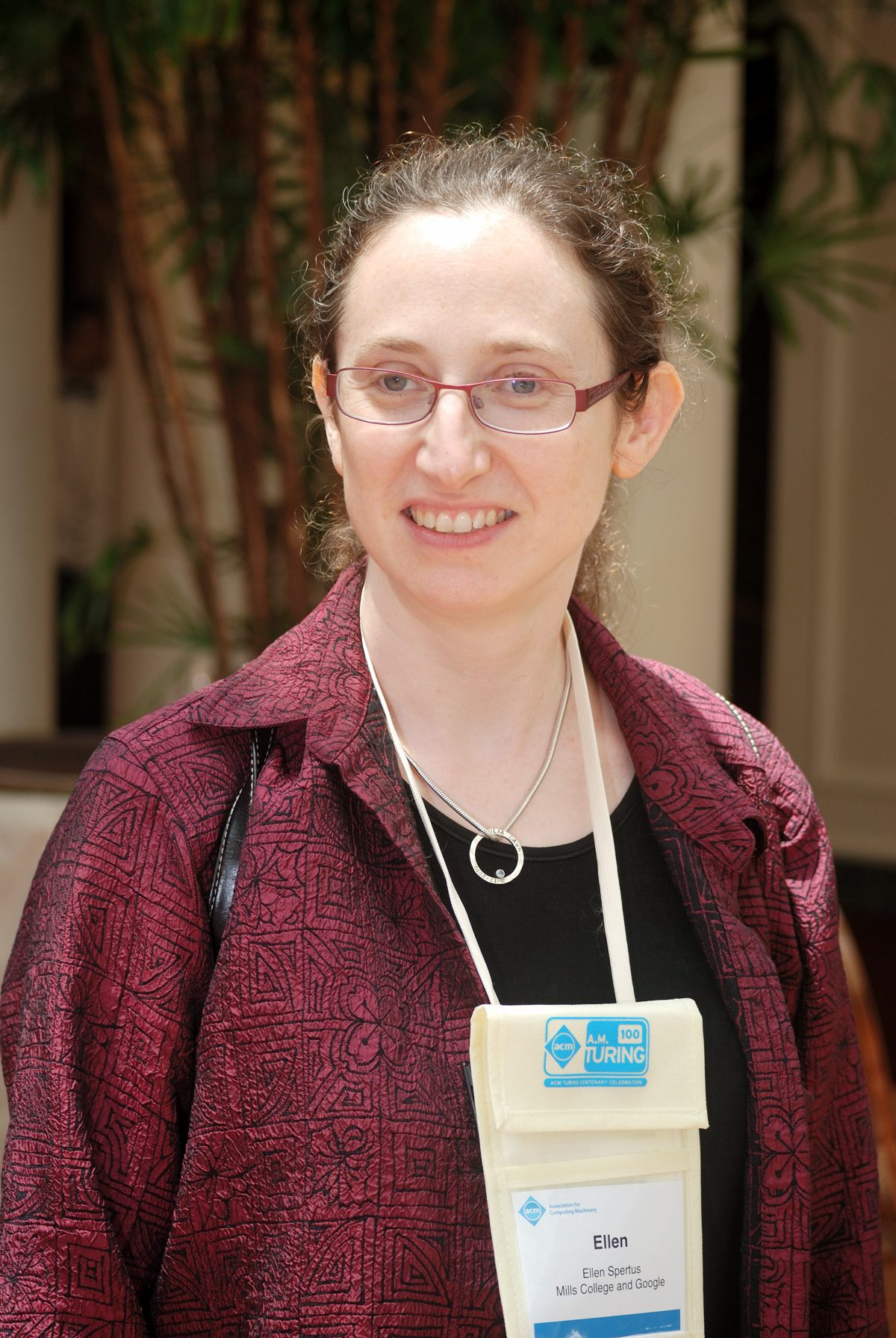
- Spertus in 2012
- Born: United States
- Education: New Trier High School; Massachusetts Institute of Technology, B.S., computer science and engineering, 1990; M.S., electrical engineering and computer science, 1992; Ph.D., electrical engineering and computer science, 1998
- Known for: App Inventor for Android; Leasing a General Motors EV1; Comparing male and female graduate student attitudes and progress
- Spouse: Keith Golden
- Awards: Sexiest Geek Alive, 2001
- Scientific career
- Fields: Computer science
- Workplaces: Microsoft; Mills College; Google
- Thesis: ParaSite: mining the structural information on the World-Wide Web (1998)
- Doctoral advisor: Lynn Andrea Stein

Ellen R. Spertus is an American computer scientist who is currently the Elinor Kilgore Snyder Professor of computer science at Mills College, Oakland, California, and a former senior research scientist at Google.

== Early life and education ==
Spertus grew up in Glencoe, Illinois, where she attended New Trier High School.

At MIT she received a Bachelor of Science in computer science and engineering in 1990, a Master of Science in electrical engineering and computer science in 1992, and a Doctor of Philosophy in electrical engineering and computer science in 1998, with a Ph.D. thesis entitled ParaSite: mining the structural information on the World-Wide Web.

== Career ==
Spertus has written articles treating both technical and social subjects, often combining the two. In 1993, she was profiled in The New York Times as one of the "women who might change the face of the computer industry" and in a follow-up article in 2003. In 2001, she was named "The Sexiest Geek Alive".

While at Google, Spertus spent her time working on App Inventor for Android, a block based development platform with a graphical user interface (GUI) that lets developers and amateurs create applications for Android. In May 2011, O'Reilly Media published the book App Inventor, which Spertus co-authored with David Wolber, Hal Abelson, and Liz Looney. She spent several summers between terms working for Microsoft.

Spertus was a lessee of one of the approximately 1,000 General Motors EV1s. She is married to computer scientist Keith Golden.

In 2014, she went on Sabbatical from Mills to work with Google for the development of the Blockly programming environment.
