= Kwikpoint =

Kwikpoint is an Alexandria, Virginia based company that develops visual language and icon translation tools designed to help users communicate without having to read written information or foreign languages. Kwikpoint's target markets include the military and public service communities, as well as corporate and leisure travelers.

== Background ==
Kwikpoint was founded in the early 1990s by Alan Stillman, following a 15,000-mile, 28-country bike trip. While on his trip, Stillman cut out pictures from magazines to help communicate his dinner selection. On his return, he worked with a team of six designers, linguists and members of the diplomatic community to create a series of universally recognizable icons that make up the Kwikpoint visual translators.

The resulting product, the Kwikpoint visual translators, include 1,000 visually recognizable symbols for use worldwide. Kwikpoint translators are used by the U.S. military and National Guard in Iraq and Afghanistan. In addition, Kwikpoint Medical Translators are used by emergency medical personnel in the United States to help communicate with patients who do not speak English.
