= Constructionism (learning theory) =

Learning theory involving the construction of mental models

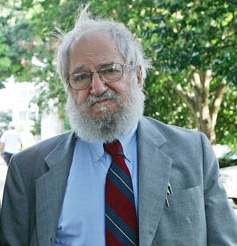
Seymour Papert

Constructionist learning is a theory of learning centred on mental models. Constructionism advocates student-centered, discovery learning where students use what they already know to acquire more knowledge. Students learn through participation in project-based learning where they make connections between different ideas and areas of knowledge facilitated by the teacher through coaching rather than using lectures or step-by-step guidance. Further, constructionism holds that learning can happen most effectively when people are active in making tangible objects in the real world. In this sense, constructionism is connected with experiential learning and builds on Jean Piaget's epistemological theory of constructivism.

Seymour Papert defined constructionism in a proposal to the National Science Foundation titled Constructionism: A New Opportunity for Elementary Science Education as follows:

The word constructionism is a mnemonic for two aspects of the theory of science education underlying this project. From constructivist theories of psychology we take a view of learning as a reconstruction rather than as a transmission of knowledge. Then we extend the idea of manipulative materials to the idea that learning is most effective when part of an activity the learner experiences as constructing a meaningful product.

Some scholars have tried to describe constructionism as a "learning-by-making" formula but, as Seymour Papert and Idit Harel say at the start of Situating Constructionism, it should be considered "much richer and more multifaceted, and very much deeper in its implications than could be conveyed by any such formula."

Papert's ideas became well known through the publication of his seminal book Mindstorms: Children, Computers, and Powerful Ideas (Basic Books, 1980). Papert described children creating programs in the Logo educational programming language. He likened their learning to living in a "mathland" where learning mathematical ideas is as natural as learning French while living in France.

== Instructional principles ==
Constructionist learning involves students drawing their own conclusions through creative experimentation and the making of social objects. The constructionist teacher takes on a mediational role rather than adopting an instructional role. Teaching "at" students is replaced by assisting them to understand—and help one another to understand—problems in a hands-on way. The teacher's role is not to be a lecturer but a facilitator who coaches students to attaining their own goals.

=== Problem-based learning ===
Problem-based learning is a constructionist method which allows students to learn about a subject by exposing them to multiple problems and asking them to construct their understanding of the subject through these problems. This kind of learning can be very effective in mathematics classes because students try to solve the problems in many different ways, stimulating their minds.

The following five strategies make problem-based learning more effective:

1. The learning activities should be related to a larger task. The larger task is important because it allows students to see that the activities can be applied to many aspects of life and, as a result, students are more likely to find the activities they are doing useful.
2. The learner needs to be supported to feel that they are beginning to have ownership of the overall problem.
3. An authentic task should be designed for the learner. This means that the task and the learner's cognitive ability have to match the problems to make learning valuable.
4. Reflection on the content being learned should occur so that learners can think through the process of what they have learned.
5. Allow and encourage the learners to test ideas against different views in different contexts.

=== Constructionism in social sciences ===
Not only can constructionism be applied to mathematics but to the social sciences as well. For example, instead of having students memorize geography facts, a teacher could give students blank maps that show unlabeled rivers, lakes, and mountains, and then ask the students to decipher where major cities might be located without the help of books or maps. This would require students to locate these areas without using prepared resources, but their prior knowledge and reasoning ability instead.

Digital storytelling is another application of constructionism to the social sciences. Students can visit institutions in the local community, to understand and document their histories, develop local maps using tools like OpenStreetMap to enrich digital maps and debate the purpose and activities of local public institutions to build an understanding of political science (civics). Digital storytelling has been used by government schools in Bengaluru to develop students understanding in the social sciences.

== Constructionism and technology ==
Papert was a huge proponent of bringing technology to classrooms, beginning with his early uses of the Logo language to teach mathematics to children. While constructionism has, due to its impetus, been primarily used in science and mathematics teaching (in the form of inquiry-based science), it is arguable that it developed in a different form in the field of media studies in which students often engage with media theory and practice simultaneously in a complementary praxis. More recently it has gained a foothold in applied linguistics in the field of second language acquisition (SLA). One such application has been the use of the popular game SimCity as a means of teaching English using constructionist techniques.

Beginning in the 1980s, The LEGO Group funded research of Papert's research group at the MIT Media Laboratory, which at the time was known as the "Epistemology and Learning Group." When LEGO launched its LEGO Mindstorms Robotics Invention System in 1998, which was based on the work of his group, it received permission to use the moniker "Mindstorms" from Seymour's 1980 book title. In The LEGO Group's LEGO Serious Play project, business people learn to express corporate issues and identity through the medium of plastic bricks.

From 2005 to 2014, there was the One Laptop Per Child initiative to put constructionist learning into practice in the developing world. The aim was to provide $100 laptops to every child in the developing world.

== Computer programming languages ==
A number of programming languages have been created, wholly or in part, for educational use, to support the constructionist approach to learning. These languages are dynamically typed, and are reflective. They include:

- Logo is a multi-paradigm language, which is an easier-to-read adaptation and dialect of Lisp, without the parentheses. Logo is known for its introduction of turtle graphics to elementary schoolchildren in the 1980s. Its creators were Wally Feurzeig, Cynthia Solomon, and Papert.
- Smalltalk is an object-oriented language that was designed and created at Xerox PARC by a team led by Alan Kay.
- AgentSheets is an early block-based programming environment for kids to create games and simulations. It is developed by Alexander Repenning
- Etoys is being developed since the 1990s under the direction of Alan Kay, most recently by the Viewpoints Research Institute, based on Morphic tile scripting. Etoys was initially targeted at primary school math and science education.
- Physical Etoys is an extension of Etoys that allows to control different devices such as Lego NXT, Arduino Board, Sphero, Kinect, Duinobot, Wiimote among others.
- Scratch was developed in the early 21st century at MIT Media Lab Lifelong Kindergarten Group led by Papert's pupil Mitchel Resnick. Like Etoys, it is based on Morphic tile scripts. Scratch was initially designed specifically to enhance the development of technological fluency at after-school centers in economically disadvantaged communities.
- StarLogo TNG was developed by the MIT Scheller Teacher Education Program under Eric Klopfer. It combines a block programming interface with 3D graphics. It is targeted at programming games and game-like simulations in middle and secondary schools.
- NetLogo was developed by Uri Wilensky. It was developed to teach children computational reasoning and thinking, and extends the Logo language by enabling the existence of many, many turtles at the same time. NetLogo is widely used not only in the K–12 environment, but also by researchers interested in the concept of agent-based modeling
- AgentCubes is a block-based programming environment for kids to create 3D games and simulation. It is developed by Alexander Repenning
- Easy Java Simulations or Ejs or EJS was developed by Open Source Physics under Francisco Esquembre. The user is working at a higher conceptual level, declaring and organizing the equations and other mathematical expressions that operate the simulation. It is targeted at programming physics simulations in secondary schools and universities.
- LEGO WeDo is a graphical programming language for children of age 7 years and up, used with the LEGO WeDo power function hub.
- LEGO MINDSTORMS EV3 is a dataflow graphical programming language for children age 10+.
- Robot Emil is a constructionist educational tool for children. It is targeted at primary schools and teaches programming step by step.
