= UCBLogo =

Logo programming language dialect

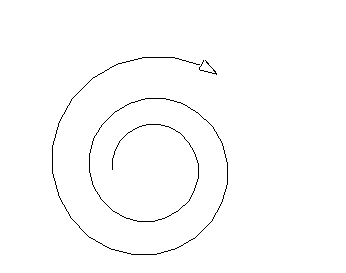
- UCBLogo allows for recursion, the process where a procedure calls itself. On the image, a spiral is produced by a recursive script.
- Paradigms: multi-paradigm:functional educational, procedural, reflective
- Family: Lisp
- Designed by: Brian Harvey
- Developers: Dan van Blerkom, Michael Katz, Doug Orleans. Substantial contributions: Freeman Deutsch, Khang Dao, Fred Gilham, Yehuda Katz, George Mills, Sanford Owings, Randy Sargent
- First appeared: 1992; 34 years ago
- Stable release: 6.2.4 / 2 July 2024; 2 years ago
- Typing discipline: dynamic
- Scope: Dynamic
- Implementation language: C
- Platform: IA-32, x86-64
- OS: Windows, macOS, Linux
- License: GPL
- Website: people.eecs.berkeley.edu/~bh/logo.html

Influenced by
- Lisp

Influenced
- Smalltalk, Etoys, Scratch, NetLogo, KTurtle, Rebol

UCBLogo, also termed Berkeley Logo, is a programming language, a dialect of Logo, which is derived from Lisp. It is intended to be a "minimum Logo standard".

It has facilities for handling lists, files, input/output (I/O), and recursion.

It can be used to teach most computer science concepts, as University of California, Berkeley lecturer Brian Harvey did in his Computer Science Logo Style trilogy. It is free and open-source software released under a GNU General Public License (GPL).

== Design ==
Logo was designed in spirit of low threshold and no ceiling, which enables easy entry by novices and yet meet the needs of high-powered users. UCBLogo has a rudimentary graphical user interface (GUI), so several projects exist that provide a better interface. MSWLogo and its successor FMSLogo, for Microsoft Windows, are commonly used in schools in the United Kingdom and Australia. For input/output (I/O), text may be written to the command window (output stream) using print and to the graphics window using label.

Animations require both the ability to draw and to erase shapes. The process is the same, except that in the former, a line is deposited on the display device and in the latter a line is removed. Using the turtle analogy, the turtle's pen must paint, and the turtle's pen must erase. The turtle can be set to erase anything below it, using the command PENERASE (PE), while the pen can be set to start drawing again with the command PENPAINT (PPT), in UCBLogo.

=== The pen ===
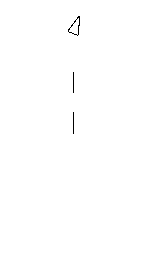
Turtle drawing a dotted line

The analogy of a turtle with a pen attached to its tail is often used. The turtle's pen can be lifted and lowered, thus drawing a rudimentary dotted line.

An example code:

 FD 20 ; draw a line and move
 PENUP ; lift the pen so it draws nothing
 FD 20 ; move and not draw
 PENDOWN ; lower the pen so it draws again
 FD 20 ; draw a line and move
 PENUP ; lift the pen so it draws nothing
 FD 40 ; move and not draw
 PENDOWN ; lower the pen so it draws again
 RT 20 ; rotate right (clockwise) 20 degrees

=== Data ===
There are three data types in UCBLogo: the word, the list, and the array (a number is a special case of word). The interpreter detects the datatype by context; there is no static typing.

Prefixing a variable with a colon (:) means the contents of, passing a variable by reference. The double quote symbol (") means the word is evaluated as itself: it is not paired as opening and closing quotes as happens in many other languages. A number is a special case of self-evaluation and can be used with or without a preceding quote.

Variable assignment is handled with the make command:

make "x sum :y 3

make takes 2 parameters, the second of which here is sum :y "3. sum takes two 'parameters' and is an 'operation', thus the calculation is possible.

Variables do not have to be declared before use; their scope is then global. A variable may be declared local, then its scope is limited to that procedure and any procedures that it calls, which is termed dynamic scope. Calling a procedure with inputs (the name usually used for arguments in the Logo literature) also creates local variables that hold the argument values.

Logo inherits lists from Lisp, and they are its main method to store vectors. A list has the advantage over an array that it is infinitely expandable. A list can be considered to be a queue with the operators queue and dequeue, or a stack with the operations push and pop. A property list is a special list where the odd number items are property names, and the even are property values.

Logo provides several common control structures. There is one conditional structure, ifelse test [ do_if_true list ] [do_if_false list]. There are three iteration commands (while, until, and repeat). Recursion, rather than iteration, is Logo's preferred processing paradigm.

Logo also provides list-based control structures. The basic idea is of two lists:

OPERATION [ a list of commands ] [ many data items ]

Each of the commands is applied in turn to each of the data items. There are several of these template commands with names like MAP, APPLY, FILTER, FOREACH, REDUCE and CASCADE. They represent four flavours of template iteration, known as explicit-slot, named-procedure, named-slot (or Lambda), and procedure-text.

== Syntax ==
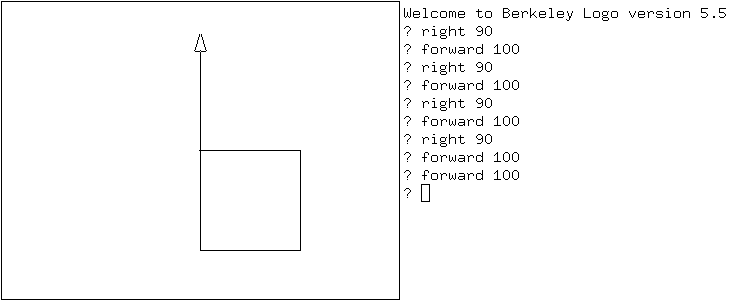
Basic Chair

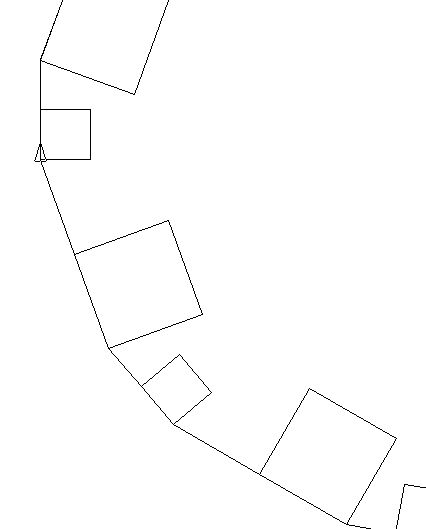
Pattern

Commands may be written on one line, or more. Many commands have mnemonic short forms; for example FORWARD and RIGHT are coded FD and RT respectively. This makes the input less onerous. Anything written after the ; (semicolon) is ignored, allowing the coder to insert comments.

 ; draws a square with sides 100 units long
 FORWARD 100
 LEFT 90
 FORWARD 100
 LEFT 90
 FORWARD 100
 LEFT 90
 FORWARD 100
 LEFT 90

 FD 100 RT 120 FD 100 RT 120 ; draws a triangle
 FD 100 RT 120

The Hello World program in Logo looks like this:

 print [Hello World]

Mathematics in Logo uses prefix or Polish notation, like: sum :x :y, product :x :y, difference :x :y, quotient :x :y. Infix is also available.

Each line is made up of function calls, of which there are two types: commands (which usually do something—effects—but do not return a value) like print, and operations (which just return a value, its output) like sum, first or readlist.

A command is similar to a Pascal procedure, and an operation is similar to a Pascal function. A special subset of operations, called predicates, which just output the word true or false, are conventionally written with a final p. Examples include emptyp, wordp, and listp. Expressions can be primitives, or can be defined by the user. Expressions can take zero, one or more parameters.

Procedures can be defined on the command line, using the TO ... END pair:

TO CHAIR
REPEAT 4 [FD 100 RT 90]  FD 200
END

Logo can pass extra information to its words, and return information. The procedure (word) is instructed to expect something and give that something a name. The colon is used for this purpose.

== See also ==
- MicroWorlds – Family of Logo computer programs
- StarLogo – Agent-based simulation language
- NetLogo – Programming language
