= MicroWorlds JR =

MicroWorlds JR is a computer program using a simplified version of the Logo programming language to teach non-readers or early readers to program in Logo. It was first launched in 2004 by Logo Computer Systems, Inc. (LCSI), and as in their original line of MicroWorlds programs, the object on the screen begins as a turtle and can be controlled with basic commands to make it move. Differing from the Logo syntax developed by Seymour Papert and teams at MIT, MicroWorlds JR uses images to replace the command names, which are selected by the child to create turtle graphics. The turtle object can be given a variety of shapes that act as a costume for the turtle, and therefore lends itself to a variety of animations and creative stories and projects for younger students.

== Constructionism and the Spirit of Logo ==
Seymour Papert and Idit Harel have developed Constructionist learning theory, based upon the premise that children learn best by making things, not just by doing. Being involved in the creation of that which is new enables the teacher to join students as an authentic co-learner, thereby modelling the strategies of expert learners. Working through problems enhances a child's ability to see transfer in the knowledge they have acquired, and when creating with Logo much of the learning has to do with 'debugging' the programs to see intended results, as well as the understanding of what is relevant and efficient in deciphering and creating the code (Skillen, 2003).
