= Microworlds =

Microworld is the world as it exists at a microscopic scale. Besides, it may also refer to:

- Microworld (video game), a 1981 text adventure game
- MicroWorlds, a computer program using the Logo programming language
  - MicroWorlds JR
- Microworlds: Writings on Science Fiction and Fantasy, a 1984 book by Stanisław Lem
- Nature's Microworlds, a 2012 British nature documentary series
- Applied Technology, a company also known as Microworld
