= MSWLogo =

Programming language

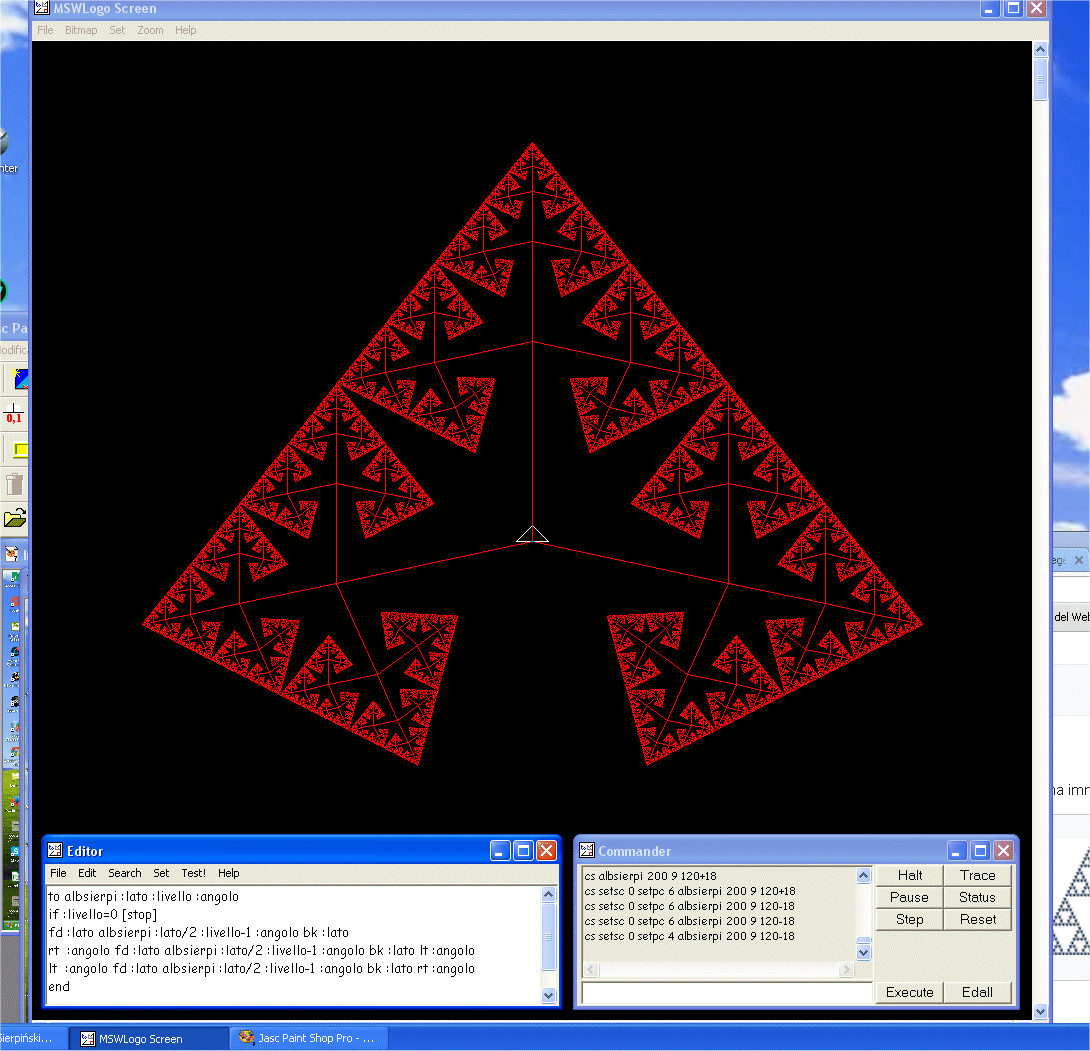
MSWLogo windows

MSWLogo is a programming language which is interpreted, based on the computer language Logo, with a graphical user interface (GUI) front end. George Mills developed it at the Massachusetts Institute of Technology (MIT). Its core is the same as UCBLogo by Brian Harvey. It is free and open-source software, with source code available, in Borland C++.

MSWLogo supports multiple turtle graphics, 3D computer graphics, and allows input from ports COM and LPT. It also supports a Windows interface, so input/output (I/O) is available through this GUI, and keyboard and mouse events can trigger interrupts. Simple GIF animations may also be produced on MSWLogo version 6.5 with the command gifsave. The program is also used as educational software. Jim Muller wrote The Great Logo Adventure, a complete Logo manual using MSWLogo as the demonstration language.

MSWLogo has evolved into FMSLogo: An Educational Programming Environment, a free, open-source implementation of the language Logo for Microsoft Windows. It is released under the GNU General Public License (GPL) and is mainly developed and maintained by David Costanzo.

== Features ==
Animated gif with turtles in MSWLogo (Lemniscate of Bernoulli)

Animated gif with turtle in MSWLogo (Limaçon)

MSWLogo, as of version 6.5b, supports many functions, including:

- TCP/IP Winsock networking
- Win16, Win32, Win32s
- Text in all available fonts and sizes.
- 1024 independent turtles.
- Bitmapped turtles
- Bitmap cut, paste, stretch
- Clipboard text and bitmaps
- MIDI devices
- Direct I/O to control external hardware
- Serial and parallel port communications
- Zooming
- Tail recursion: optimizes most recursive functions
- User error handling
- Standard Logo parsing
- Save and restore images. BMP format files
- Color bits per pixel: 1, 4, 8, 16, 24
- Standard Windows hypertext help
- Standard Windows printing
- Separate library and work area
- Construction of Windows dialogue boxes
- Event-driven programming: mouse, keyboard, timer
- Multimedia devices: WAV sound files, CD-ROM control, etc.
- Event timers allowing multiprocessing
- 3D perspective drawing: wire-frame and solid
- Animated GIF generation

| Command | Abbr. | Syntax | Output | Example |
|---|---|---|---|---|
| FORWARD | fd | FORWARD␣⟨number of steps to move forward⟩ | Moves turtle forward for number of times specified | forward 100 or fd 100 |
| BACK | bk | BACK␣⟨number of steps to move backward⟩ | Moves turtle back for number of times specified | back 100 or bk 100 |
| RIGHT | rt | RIGHT␣⟨degrees to rotate toward right⟩ | Turns turtle right for number of degrees specified | right 228 or rt 228 |
| LEFT | lt | LEFT␣⟨degrees to rotate toward left⟩ | Turns turtle left for number of degrees specified | left 228 or lt 228 |
| HOME | home | | Comes to screen center but does not clear the screen | home |
| CLEAN | ct cs | | Clears the screen of trails but the turtle remains where it is without moving | clean |
| CLEARSCREEN | CS | | Clears the screen of trails and comes to screen center | cs |
| HIDETURTLE | HT | | Hides the turtle and aids viewing a clear drawing on the screen | ht |
| SHOWTURTLE | ST | | Shows the turtle after it is hidden from the screen | st |
| PENUP | PU | | Sets the turtle to move without drawing | pu |
| PENDOWN | PD | | Resets to a drawing pen when ordered to move | pd |
| CLEARTEXT | CT | | Clears all text in the command screen | ct |
| CIRCLE | | | Makes a circle repeat 360 [FD ⟨desired length in number of pixels divided by 360⟩ RT or LT 1] | circle |
| Pattern | pay | | Makes a pattern | pattern |
| SetPC | | SetPC␣⟨RGB value here (ex. 255, 255, 255)⟩ | Sets the pen color to that rgb value | setpc [255 255 255] |
| SetSC | | SetSC␣⟨RGB value here (ex. 255, 255, 255)⟩ | Sets the screen color to that rgb value | setsc [255 255 255] |
