= MicroWorlds =

Family of Logo computer programs

- Other names: MicroMundos
- Original author: Seymour Papert
- Developer: Logo Computer Systems Inc.
- Initial release: 1993; 32 years ago
- Operating system: MS-DOS, Mac, Windows
- Predecessor: Apple Logo, Atari Logo, LogoWriter
- Successor: Lynx
- Available in: English, Portuguese, Spanish
- Website: microworlds.com

MicroWorlds is a family of computer programs developed by Logo Computer Systems Inc. (LCSI) that uses the Logo programming language and a turtle-shaped object to teach language, mathematics, programming, and robotics concepts in primary and secondary education. The program was part of a larger set of dialects and implementations created by Seymour Papert aimed at triggering the development of abstract ideas by children through experimentation.

MicroWorlds was first released in 1993 for MS-DOS and Classic Mac OS computers, and in 1996 for Microsoft Windows. The program became incompatible with macOS 10.15 and higher due to requiring 32-bit architecture. Support for the program on Windows ended 30 November, 2023 and LCSI on announced a browser-based program called Lynx would be the program's replacement.

== Release history ==
The precursors to MicroWorlds were the programs Apple Logo, Atari Logo, and LogoWriter released by LCSI for the Mac, Atari 8-bit computers, and IBM PC compatibles in the 1980s. The first version to bear the MicroWorlds name was released in 1993 for MS-DOS and Mac called MicroWorlds Project Builder. Two modules were released to accompany the software called "Math Links" and "Language Arts."

MicroWorlds 2.0 was released in 1996 for Windows 95 and in 1998 for Mac. Modules for weather and plants were released in 1997, as well as a web browser plugin to view projects in Internet Explorer and Netscape Navigator without the full software installed. Spanish and Portuguese editions were released under the name MicroMundos.

MicroWorlds Pro, an advanced version intended for high school students, was released in 1999 for Windows 95/98/NT and in 2000 for Mac.

MicroWorlds EX, the final iteration of the full software, was released in 2003 for Windows 98 and up (later supported for only Windows 10 and 11), and in 2004 for Mac OS X. A “Robotics edition” was released for both platforms that worked with Lego RCX programmable bricks and the Handy Cricket microcontroller system. An "Exploring Math" module intended for Grades 4-7 was released in 2005 and a "Computer Science" module released in 2013. The program has been made available in French, Spanish, Russian, Chinese, Portuguese, Italian, Armenian, and Greek. MicroWorlds EX will not work with macOS 10.15 or higher due to requiring 32-bit support.

MicroWorlds JR, a derivative product teaching coding to young children who cannot read, was released in 2004 for Windows XP and 2005 for Mac OS X.

== Features ==
MicroWorlds relies on Logo, a computer programming language based on words and syntax that are intended to be easy to learn and remember. The software is able to execute multiple tasks independently, can import pictures, and create multimedia projects like games and simulations.

Users write code in a dialect of the Logo programming language to move a customizable cursor (initially in the shape of a turtle), draw shapes, or to make dialog boxes appear. The user may write code in one of two areas of the program, using the program's "command module" to execute short commands immediately or the "procedure page" for more complex sets of instructions that can be stored and referenced at any time.

== Reception ==
MicroWorlds is used as the main component of the curriculum used by OpenWorld Learning, an educational non-profit based in Denver, Colorado, that as of 2016 operated 11 elementary sites and three middle school sites in the Denver area. The organization provides a free after-school program to students interested in STEM (Science, Technology, Engineering and Math) education.

== See also ==
- LibreLogo
- NetLogo
- StarLogo
- Turtlestitch
