= FMSLogo =

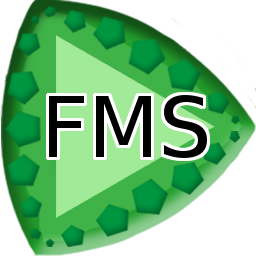

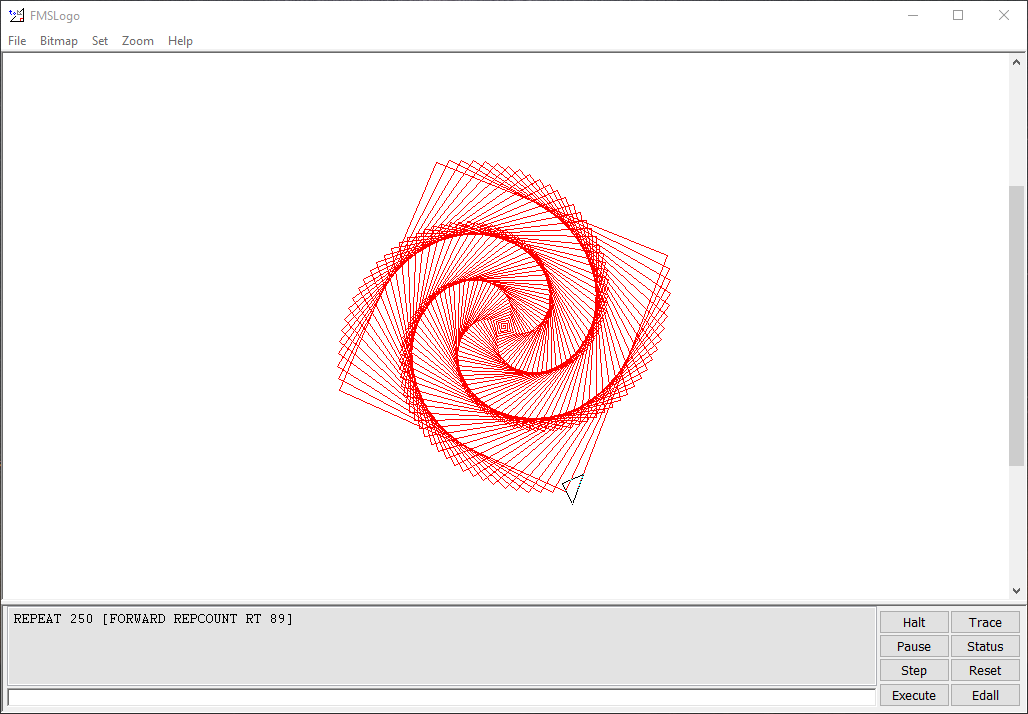
- Screenshot of FMSLogo v6.35.0
- Developer: David Costanzo
- Initial release: 11 October 2005; 20 years ago
- Stable release: 8.3.2 / 5 April 2022; 4 years ago
- Operating system: Windows 95 and later
- Available in: English, French, Italian, Greek, Portuguese, German, Spanish, Russian
- Type: Programming language
- License: GNU General Public License
- Website: fmslogo.sourceforge.net

FMSLogo is a free implementation of a computing environment called Logo, which is an educational interpreter language. GUI and Extensions were developed by George Mills at MIT. Its core is the same as UCBLogo by Brian Harvey. It is free software, with source available, written with Borland C++ and WxWidgets.

FMSLogo supports multiple turtles, and 3D Graphics. FMSLogo allows input from COM ports and LPT ports. FMSLogo also supports a windows interface thus I/O is available through this GUI- and keyboard and mouse events can trigger interrupts. Simple GIF animations may also be produced with the GIFSAVE command. Jim Muller wrote The Great Logo Adventure, a complete Logo manual using MSWLogo as the demonstration language.

FMSLogo evolved from MSWLogo: An Educational Programming Environment, a free, open source implementation of the Logo programming language for Microsoft Windows. It is released under the GPL and is mainly developed and maintained by David Costanzo.

== Features ==
FMSLogo has following support of various functionality:

- "Standard" Logo parsing
- Turtle Graphics
- Exception handling
- TCP/IP networking
- Text in all available system fonts
- 1024 independent turtles
- Bitmapped turtles
- MIDI devices
- Direct I/O for controlling external hardware (must be admin)
- Serial and parallel port communications
- Saving and loading images in BMP format
- Calling into native DLLs
- Creating windows dialog boxes
- Event driven programming (mouse, keyboard, timer)
