= Uri Wilensky =

American academic and programmer

- Born: June 18, 1955 (age 70)
- Education: Brandeis University (BA & MA); Harvard University (MA); Massachusetts Institute of Technology (PhD)
- Known for: NetLogo
- Awards: ISDDE Prize for Excellence in Educational Design (2016); Yidan Prize for Educational Research (2025)
- Scientific career
- Fields: Computer science Learning sciences Complex Systems; Agent-based modeling Constructionist learning
- Institutions: Northwestern University
- Doctoral advisors: Seymour Papert

Uri Wilensky is an American computer scientist and creator of the agent-based modeling platform NetLogo. He is the Lorraine H. Morton Professor of Learning Sciences, Computer Science and Complex Systems at Northwestern University where he directs the Center for Connected Learning and Computer-Based Modeling. He also co-founded the Northwestern Institute on Complex Systems (NICO), and co-founded and co-directs the joint Computer Science + Learning Sciences PhD program.

== Education ==
Uriel Joseph Wilensky received a B.A. in Mathematics and Philosophy and an M.A. in mathematics from Brandeis University, an M.A. in mathematics from Harvard University, and a Ph.D. in Media Arts and Sciences from the MIT Media Lab.

== Career ==
Wilensky has worked in the fields of computer science and learning sciences, specializing in agent-based modeling and complex systems education. Wilensky originally developed NetLogo in 1999.

His work on the theory of "restructurations" explores how representing knowledge in computational media changes how we think and learn, particularly in the domain of complex systems. He argues that, in general, well-designed representations can make difficult concepts accessible. In the case of NetLogo, students can make sense of complex systems by building and exploring agent-based models in which "agents" are programmed to follow simple behaviors from which large-scale patterns emerge.

== Awards ==
In 2016, Wilensky won the International Society for Design and Development in Education (ISDDE) Prize for Excellence in Educational Design.

Wilensky was elected to the National Academy of Education in 2022 and the American Academy of Arts & Sciences in 2024.

Wilensky was awarded the 2025 Yidan Prize for Education Research.

== Selected publications ==
=== Book ===
- Wilensky, Uri; Rand, William (2015). An Introduction to Agent-Based Modeling: Modeling Natural, Social, and Engineered Complex Systems with NetLogo. Cambridge, Massachusetts: MIT Press. ISBN 978-0-262-73189-8.

=== Articles ===
- Wilensky, U.; Resnick, M. (1999). "Thinking in Levels: A Dynamic Systems Approach to Making Sense of the World". Journal of Science Education and Technology. 8 (1): 3–19. Bibcode:1999JSEdT...8....3W. doi:10.1023/A:1009421303064.
- Wilensky, U. (2003). "Statistical Mechanics for Secondary School: The GasLab Multi-agent Modeling Toolkit". International Journal of Computers for Mathematical Learning. 8 (1): 1–41. doi:10.1023/A:1025651502936.
- Wilensky, U.; Reisman, K. (2006). "Thinking Like a Wolf, a Sheep, or a Firefly: Learning Biology Through Constructing and Testing Computational Theories—An Embodied Modeling Approach". Cognition and Instruction. 24 (2): 171–209. doi:10.1207/s1532690xci2402_1.
- Jacobson, M.J.; Wilensky, U. (2006). "Complex Systems in Education: Scientific and Educational Importance and Implications for the Learning Sciences". Journal of the Learning Sciences. 15 (1): 11–34. doi:10.1207/s15327809jls1501_4.
- Levy, S.T.; Wilensky, U. (2008). "Inventing a "Mid Level" to Make Ends Meet: Reasoning between the Levels of Complexity". Cognition and Instruction. 26 (1): 1–47. doi:10.1080/07370000701798479.
- Wilensky, U.; Papert, S. (2010). Reformulating Knowledge Disciplines through New Representational Forms (PDF). Constructionism. Paris.
- Maroulis, S.; Bakshy, E.; Gomez, L.; Wilensky, U. (2014). "Modeling the transition to public school choice". Journal of Artificial Societies and Social Simulation. 17 (2) 3. doi:10.18564/jasss.2402.
- Wilensky, U.; Brady, C.; Horn, M. (2014). "Education: Fostering computational literacy in science classrooms". Communications of the ACM. 57 (8): 24–28. doi:10.1145/2633031.
- Wilensky, Uri (2020). "Restructuration Theory and Agent-Based Modeling: Reformulating Knowledge Domains Through Computational Representations". In Holbert, Nathan; Berland, Matthew; Kafai, Yasmin B. (eds.). Designing Constructionist Futures: The Art, Theory, and Practice of Learning Designs. MIT Press. pp. 287–300. ISBN 978-0-262-53984-5.
