= Wally Feurzeig =

American computer scientist

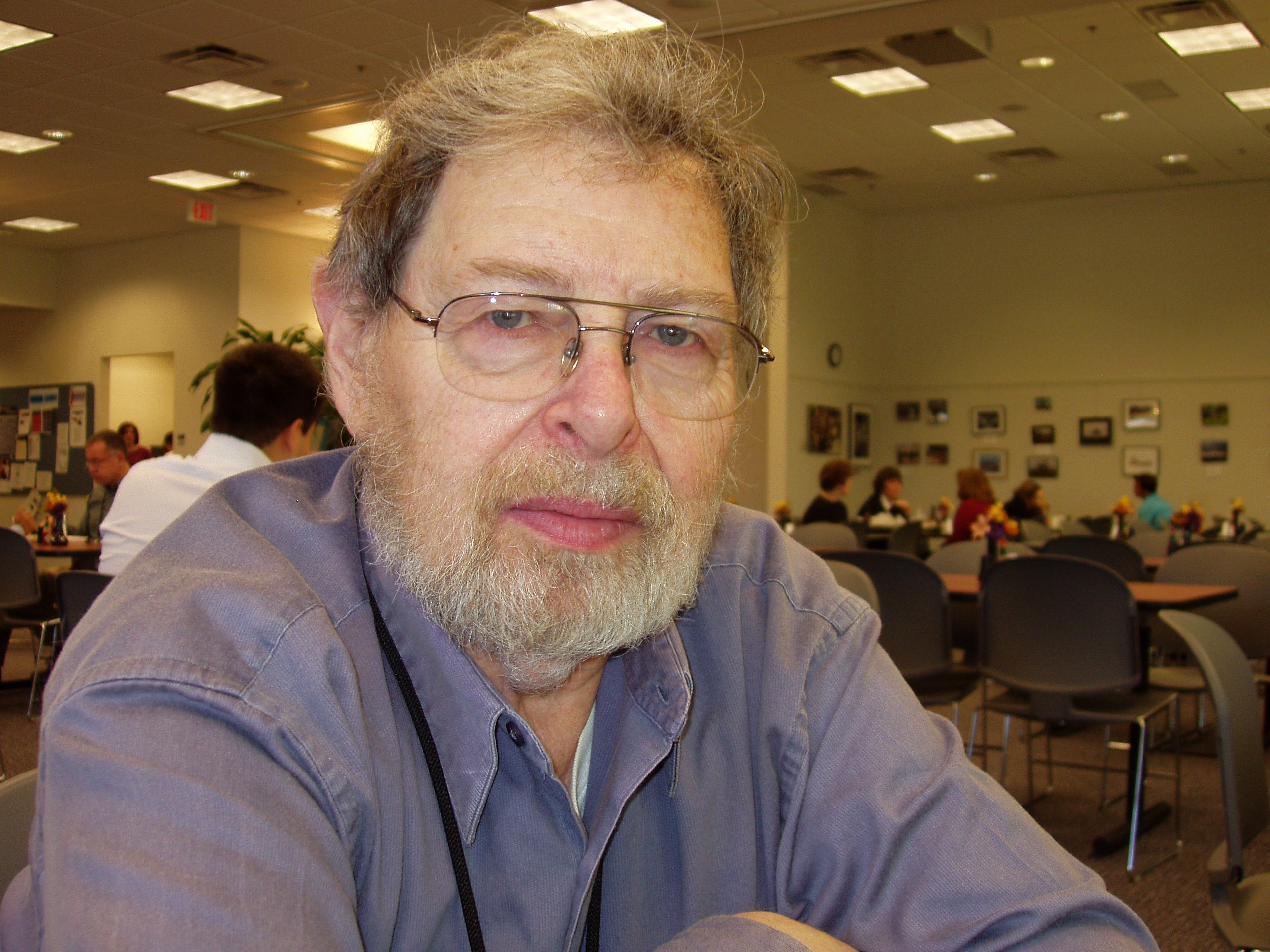
- Wally Feurzig in the BBN cafeteria, April 2006
- Born: Wallace Feurzeig; June 10, 1927; Chicago, Illinois, United States
- Died: January 4, 2013 (aged 85)
- Education: University of Chicago (BS, PhB); Illinois Institute of Technology (MS)
- Known for: Logo
- Spouse: Nanni Feurzeig
- Children: 3
- Scientific career
- Fields: Computer science Artificial intelligence Educational programming language
- Workplaces: Argonne National Laboratory; University of Chicago; Bolt, Beranek and Newman (BBN)

Wallace "Wally" Feurzeig (June 10, 1927 – January 4, 2013) was an American computer scientist who was co-inventor, with Seymour Papert and Cynthia Solomon, of the programming language Logo

== Early life and education ==
Wallace Feurzeig was born in Chicago to parents Mandel and Pauline Feurzeig. He earned Bachelor of Philosophy and Bachelor of Science degrees from the University of Chicago, and a Master of Science degree from the Illinois Institute of Technology. He worked at Argonne National Laboratory and the University of Chicago before joining Bolt, Beranek and Newman (BBN).

== Career ==
During the early 1960s, Bolt, Beranek and Newman had become a major center of computer science research and innovative applications. In 1962, Wally Feurzeig joined the firm to work with its newly available facilities in the Artificial Intelligence Department, one of the earliest AI organizations. His colleagues were actively engaged in some of the pioneering AI work in computer pattern recognition, natural-language understanding, automated theorem proving, Lisp language development, and robot problem solving.

Much of this work was done in collaboration with distinguished researchers at the Massachusetts Institute of Technology (MIT) such as Marvin Minsky and John McCarthy, who were regular BBN consultants during the early 1960s. Other groups at BBN were doing original work in cognitive science, instructional research and man-computer communication. Some of the first work on knowledge representation and reasoning (semantic networks), question answering, interactive computer graphics, and computer-aided instruction (CAI) was actively underway. J. C. R. Licklider was the spiritual and scientific leader of much of this work, championing the cause of on-line interaction during an era when almost all computing was being done via batch processing.

Wally's initial focus was on expanding the intellectual abilities of extant teaching systems. This led to the first intelligent CAI system, MENTOR, which employed production rules to support problem-solving interactions in medical diagnosis and other decision-making domains. In 1965, Wally organized the BBN Educational Technology Department to further the development of computer methods to improve learning and teaching, and the focus of his work then shifted to investigating programming languages as educational environments. This shift was partly due to two recent technological advances: the invention of computer time-sharing and the development of the first high-level conversational programming language.

The idea of sharing a computer's cycles among autonomous users, working simultaneously, had stirred the imagination in Cambridge in 1963 and 1964. BBN and MIT teams raced to be first to realize this concept, with BBN winning by days and holding the first successful demonstration of computer time-sharing in 1964. BBN's initial system, designed by Sheldon Boilen, supported five simultaneous users on a DEC PDP-1, all sharing one cathode-ray tube (CRT) screen for output. Seeing dynamic displays from several distinct programs, simultaneously and asynchronously ("out of time and tune"), was a breathtaking experience.

Time sharing made feasible the economic use of remote distributed terminals and opened up the possibilities of interactive computer use in schools. BBN had recently implemented TELCOMP, one of the new breed of high-level interactive programming languages. TELCOMP was a dialect of JOSS, the first conversational or interpreted language, developed in 1962–63 by Cliff Shaw of the RAND Corporation. Its syntax was similar to that of the language BASIC, which had not yet appeared. Like BASIC, TELCOMP was a FORTRAN-derived language originally designed for numerical computational applications. Shortly after TELCOMP was created, Wally decided to introduce it to children as a tool to teach mathematics and in 1965–66, under U.S. Office of Education support, explored its use as an auxiliary resource in eight elementary and secondary schools served by the BBN time-sharing system. Students were introduced to TELCOMP and then worked on standard arithmetic, algebra, and trigonometry problems by writing TELCOMP programs. The project strongly confirmed expectations that the use of interactive computation with a high-level interpretive language would be highly motivating to students.

Wally's collaborators in this research were Daniel Bobrow, Richard Grant, and Cynthia Solomon from BBN and consultant Seymour Papert, who had recently arrived at MIT from Jean Piaget's Institute in Geneva. The idea of a programming language expressly designed for children arose directly from this project. The group realized that most extant languages were designed for doing computation and that they generally lacked facilities for nonnumeric symbolic manipulation. Current languages were inappropriate for education in other respects also: they often employed extensive data type declarations that got in the way of students' expressive impetus; they had serious deficiencies in control structures; their programs lacked procedural constructs; most had no facilities for dynamic definition and execution; few had well-developed and articulate debugging, diagnostic and editing facilities, so essential for educational uses.
