= Atari Logo =

- Startup screen
- Developer: LCSI
- Initial release: 1983; 43 years ago
- Written in: Assembly language
- Platform: Atari 8-bit
- Available in: English
- Type: Logo interpreter
- License: Copyright © 1983 LCSI, Proprietary

Atari Logo is ROM cartridge-based version of the Logo programming language for the Atari 8-bit computers published by Atari, Inc. in 1983. It was developed by Logo Computer Systems, Inc. (LCSI) in Quebec, Canada. LCSI wrote Apple Logo, and the Atari version maintains strong compatibility with it.

Atari Logo includes commands that support Atari 8-bit enhanced graphics: 4 simultaneous drawing turtles that look like actual turtles instead of triangles, a built-in editor for redefining turtle shapes, and an event handler for collision detection. The TOOT primitive plays a tone on one of two 16-bit audio channels given a frequency, volume, and duration. Atari Logo shipped with a 216-page manual and a 16-page Quick Reference Guide.

== Reception ==
Scott Mace of InfoWorld wrote, "Atari Logo is an excellent product and it enhances the value of Atari computers for learning in the classroom and in the home. It wins the battle with BASIC hands down."

In a 1983 review for ANALOG Computing, Brian Moriarty concluded, "Atari Logo is one of the most intelligently-conceived and well-executed pieces of software ever published by ATARI."
