= Turtle graphics =

Vector graphics using a relative cursor on a Cartesian plane

In computer graphics, turtle graphics are vector graphics using a relative cursor (the "turtle") upon a Cartesian plane (x and y axis). Turtle graphics is a key feature of the Logo programming language. It is also a simple and didactic way of dealing with moving frames.

== Overview ==
An animation that shows how the turtle is used to create graphics by combining forward and turn commands while a pen is touching the paper

A spiral drawn with an iterative turtle graphics algorithm

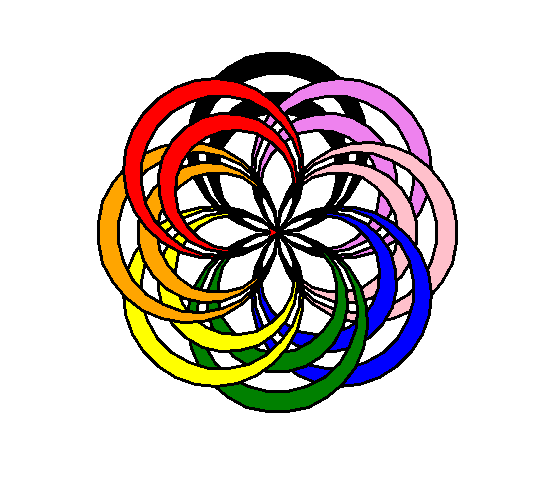
A turtle graphic pattern drawn with a Python program

The turtle has three attributes: a location, an orientation (or direction), and a pen. The pen, too, has attributes: color, width, and on/off state (also called down and up).

The turtle moves with commands that are relative to its own position, such as "move forward 10 spaces" and "turn left 90 degrees". The pen carried by the turtle can also be controlled, by enabling it, setting its color, or setting its width. A student could understand (and predict and reason about) the turtle's motion by imagining what they would do if they were the turtle. Seymour Papert called this "body syntonic" reasoning.

A full turtle graphics system requires control flow, procedures, and recursion: many turtle drawing programs fall short. From these building blocks one can build more complex shapes like squares, triangles, circles and other composite figures. The idea of turtle graphics, for example is useful in a Lindenmayer system for generating fractals.

Turtle geometry is also sometimes used in graphics environments as an alternative to a strictly coordinate-addressed graphics system.

== History ==
Turtle graphics are often associated with the Logo programming language. Seymour Papert added support for turtle graphics to Logo in the late 1960s to support his version of the turtle robot, a simple robot controlled from the user's workstation that is designed to carry out the drawing functions assigned to it using a small retractable pen set into or attached to the robot's body. Turtle geometry works somewhat differently from (x,y) addressed Cartesian geometry, being primarily vector-based (i.e. relative direction and distance from a starting point) in comparison to coordinate-addressed systems such as bitmaps or raster graphics. As a practical matter, the use of turtle geometry instead of a more traditional model mimics the actual movement logic of the turtle robot. The turtle is traditionally and most often represented pictorially either as a triangle or a turtle icon (though it can be represented by any icon).

Today, the Python programming language's standard library includes a Turtle graphics module. Like its Logo predecessor, the Python implementation of turtle allows programmers to control one or more turtles in a two-dimensional space. Since the standard Python syntax, control flow, and data structures can be used alongside the turtle module, turtle has become a popular way for programmers learning Python to familiarize themselves with the basics of the language.

== Extension to three dimensions ==
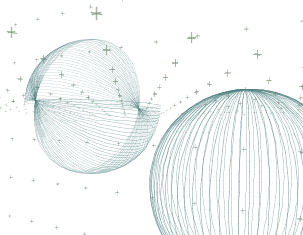
3D turtle graphics generated with Cheloniidae Turtle Graphics

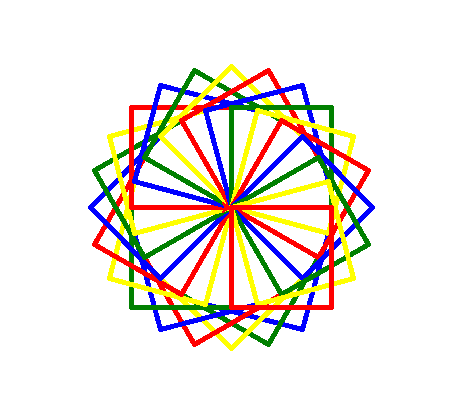
Pattern drawn with a Python program

The ideas behind turtle graphics can be extended to include three-dimensional space. This is achieved by using one of several different coordinate models. A common setup is cartesian-rotational as with the original 2D turtle: an additional "up" vector (normal vector) is defined to choose the plane the turtle's 2D "forward" vector rotates in; the "up" vector itself also rotates around the "forward" vector. In effect, the turtle has two different heading angles, one within the plane and the other determining the plane's angle. Usually changing the plane's angle does not move the turtle, in line with the traditional setup.

Verhoeff 2010 implements the two vector approach; a roll command is used to rotate the "up" vector around the "forward" vector. The article proceeds to develop an algebraic theory to prove geometric properties from syntactic properties of the underlying turtle programs. One of the insights is that a dive command is really a shorthand of a turn-roll-turn sequence.

Cheloniidae Turtle Graphics is a 3D turtle library for Java. It has a bank command (same as roll) and a pitch command (same as dive) in the "Rotational Cartesian Turtle". Other coordinate models, including non-Euclidean geometry, are allowed but not included.

== Code example ==
The following Python code uses the turtle module to create a rainbow spiral:

import turtle as t

t.shape("turtle")

x = 1
t.speed(10)
colors = ["red", "orange", "yellow", "green", "blue", "purple"]

for i in range(100):
    for i in colors:
        t.forward(x * 0.3)
        t.left(60)
        t.color(i)
        t.right(30.5)
        x = x + 1

== See also ==
Animated gif with turtle in MSWLogo (Cycloid)

- Moving frame
- KTurtle
- L-system
- UCBLogo
- NetLogo
- FMSLogo
- MSWLogo
- Joy (programming language)
