= Logo (programming language) =

Computer programming language

- L-system (Koch curve) turtle graphic
- Paradigms: Multi-paradigm: functional, educational, procedural, reflective
- Family: Lisp
- Designed by: Wally Feurzeig, Seymour Papert, Cynthia Solomon
- Developer: Bolt, Beranek and Newman
- First appeared: 1967; 59 years ago
- Typing discipline: Dynamic
- Website: el.media.mit.edu/logo-foundation/index.html

Major implementations
- UCBLogo, many others

Dialects
- StarLogo, NetLogo and AppleLogo

Influenced by
- Lisp

Influenced
- AgentSheets, NetLogo, Smalltalk, Etoys, Scratch, Microsoft Small Basic, KTurtle, REBOL, Boxer

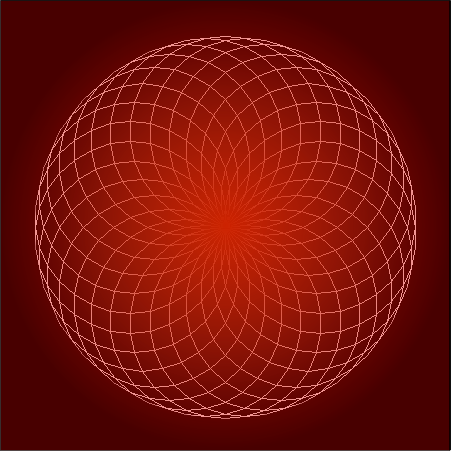
Symmetry around a point can be obtained using only a few instructions, allowing users to draw hypotrochoids like the one shown here.

Logo is an educational programming language, designed in 1967 by Wally Feurzeig, Seymour Papert, and Cynthia Solomon. The name was coined by Feurzeig while he was at Bolt, Beranek and Newman, and derives from the Greek logos, meaning 'word' or 'thought'.

A general-purpose language, Logo is widely known for its use of turtle graphics, in which commands for movement and drawing produced line or vector graphics, either on screen or with a small robot termed a turtle. The language was conceived to teach concepts of programming related to Lisp and only later to enable what Papert called "body-syntonic reasoning", where students could understand, predict, and reason about the turtle's motion by imagining what they would do if they were the turtle. There are substantial differences among the many dialects of Logo, and the situation is confused by the regular appearance of turtle graphics programs that are named Logo.

Logo is a multi-paradigm adaptation and dialect of Lisp, a functional programming language. There is no standard Logo, but UCBLogo has the facilities for handling lists, files, I/O, and recursion in scripts, and can be used to teach all computer science concepts, as UC Berkeley lecturer Brian Harvey did in his Computer Science Logo Style trilogy.

Logo is usually an interpreted language, although compiled Logo dialects (such as Lhogho and Liogo) have been developed. Logo is not case-sensitive but retains the case used for formatting purposes.

== History ==
Logo was created in 1967 at Bolt, Beranek and Newman (BBN), a Cambridge, Massachusetts, research firm, by Wally Feurzeig, Cynthia Solomon, and Seymour Papert. Its intellectual roots are in artificial intelligence, mathematical logic and developmental psychology. For the first four years of Logo research, development, and teaching work was done at BBN. The first implementation of Logo, called Ghost, was written in LISP on a PDP-1. The goal was to create a mathematical land where children could play with words and sentences. Modeled on LISP, the design goals of Logo included accessible power and informative error messages. The use of virtual turtles allowed for immediate visual feedback and debugging of graphic programming.

The first working Logo turtle robot was created in 1969. A display turtle preceded the physical floor turtle. Modern Logo has not changed very much from the basic concepts predating the first turtle. The first turtle was a tethered floor roamer, not radio-controlled or Wireless. At BBN, Paul Wexelblat developed a turtle named Irving that had touch sensors and could move forward, backwards, rotate, and ding its bell. The earliest year-long school users of Logo were in 1968–69 at Muzzey Jr. High in Lexington, Massachusetts. The virtual and physical turtles were first used by fifth-graders at the Bridge School in the same city in 1970–71.

== Turtle and graphics ==
Animated gif with turtle in MSWLogo (Cardioid)

Logo's most-known feature is the turtle (derived originally from a robot of the same name), an on-screen "cursor" that shows output from commands for movement and a small retractable pen, together producing line graphics. It has traditionally been displayed either as a triangle or a turtle icon (though it can be represented by any icon). Turtle graphics were added to the Logo language by Seymour Papert in the late 1960s to support Papert's version of the turtle robot, a simple robot controlled from the user's workstation that is designed to carry out the drawing functions assigned to it using a small retractable pen set into or attached to the robot's body.

As a practical matter, the use of turtle geometry instead of a more traditional model mimics the actual movement logic of the turtle robot. The turtle moves with commands that are relative to its own position, LEFT 90 means spin left by 90 degrees. Some Logo implementations, particularly those that allow the use of concurrency and multiple turtles, support collision detection and allow the user to redefine the appearance of the turtle cursor, essentially allowing the Logo turtles to function as sprites.

Turtle geometry is also sometimes used in environments other than Logo as an alternative to a strictly coordinate-addressed graphics system. For instance, the idea of turtle graphics is also useful in Lindenmayer system for generating fractals.

== Implementations ==
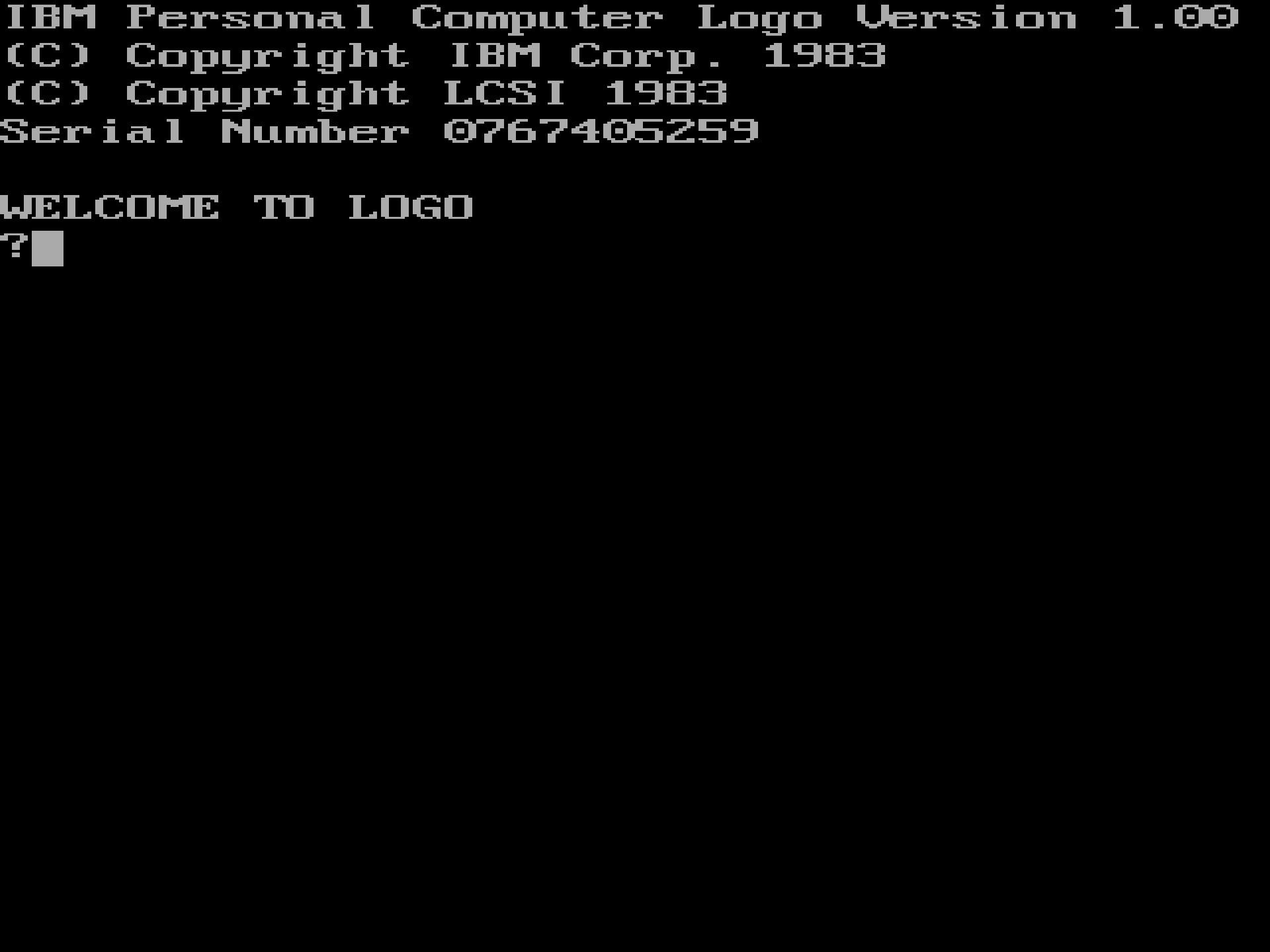
IBM LCSI logo welcome screen

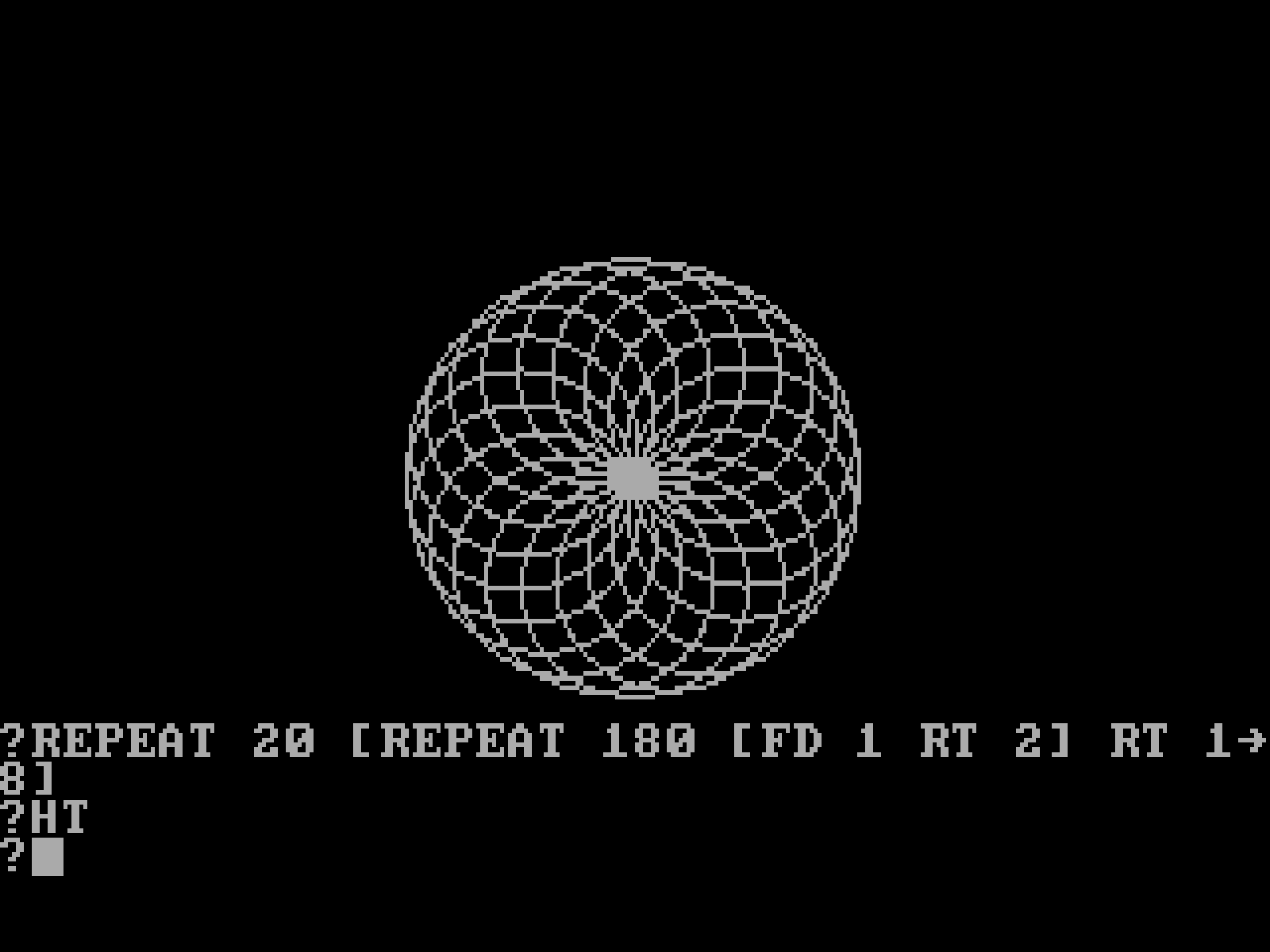
Source code and output in IBM LCSI Logo

Some modern derivatives of Logo allow thousands of independently moving turtles. There are two popular implementations: Massachusetts Institute of Technology's StarLogo and Northwestern University Center for Connected Learning's (CCL) NetLogo. They allow exploring emergent phenomena and come with many experiments in social studies, biology, physics, and other areas. NetLogo is widely used in agent-based simulation in the biological and social sciences.

Although there is no agreed-upon standard, there is a broad consensus on core aspects of the language. In March 2020, there were 308 implementations and dialects of Logo, each with its own strengths. Most of those 308 are no longer in wide use, but many are still under development. Commercial implementations widely used in schools include MicroWorlds Logo and Imagine Logo.

Legacy and current implementations include:

First released in the 1980s

- Apple Logo for the Apple II Plus and Apple Logo Writer for the Apple IIe, developed by Logo Computer Systems, Inc. (LCSI), were the most broadly used and prevalent early implementations of Logo that peaked in the early to mid-1980s.
- Aquarius LOGO was released in 1982 on cartridge by Mattel for the Aquarius home computer.
- Atari Logo, developed by LCSI, was released on cartridge by Atari, Inc. in 1983 for the Atari 8-bit computers.
- Color Logo was released in 1983 on cartridge (26–2722) and disk (26–2721) by Tandy for the TRS-80 Color Computer.
- Commodore Logo was released, with the subtitle "A Language for Learning", by Commodore International. It was based on MIT Logo and enhanced by Terrapin, Inc. The Commodore 64 version (C64105) was released on diskette in 1983; the Plus/4 version (T263001) was released on cartridge in 1984.
- SmartLOGO was released on cassette by Coleco for the ADAM home computer in 1984. It was developed by LCSI and included a primer, Turtle Talk, by Seymour Papert.
- ExperLogo was released in 1985 on diskette by Expertelligence Inc. for the Macintosh 128K.
- Hot-Logo was released in the mid-1980s by EPCOM for the MSX 8-bit computers with its own set of commands in Brazilian Portuguese.
- TI Logo (for the TI-99/4A computer) was used in primary schools, emphasizing Logo's usefulness in teaching computing fundamentals to novice programmers.
- Sprite Logo, also developed by Logo Computer Systems Inc., had ten turtles that could run as independent processes. It ran on Apple II computers, with the aid of a Sprite Card inserted in one of the computer's slots.
- IBM marketed their own version of Logo (P/N 6024076), developed jointly by Logo Computer Systems, Inc. (LCSI), for their then-new IBM PC.
- ObjectLOGO is a variant of Logo with object-oriented programming extensions and lexical scoping. Version 2.7 was sold by Digitool, Inc. It is no longer being developed or supported, and does not run on versions of the Mac operating system later than 7.5.
- Dr. Logo was developed by Digital Research and distributed with computers including the IBM PCjr, Atari ST and the Amstrad CPC.
- Acornsoft Logo was released in 1985. It is a commercial implementation of Logo for the 8-bit BBC Micro and Acorn Electron computers. It was developed for Acorn Computers as a full implementation of Logo. It features multiple screen turtles and four-channel sound. It was provided on two 16kB ROMs, with utilities and drivers as accompanying software.
- Lego Logo is a version of Logo that can manipulate robotic Lego bricks attached to a computer. It was implemented on the Apple II and used in American and other grade schools in the late 1980s and early 1990s. Lego Logo is a precursor to Scratch.

First released in the 1990s

- In February 1990, Electron User published Timothy Grantham's simple implementation of Logo for the Acorn Electron under the article "Talking Turtle".
- Comenius Logo is an implementation of Logo developed by Comenius University Faculty of Mathematics and Physics. It started development in December 1991, and is also known in other countries as SuperLogo, MultiLogo, and MegaLogo.
- UCBLogo, also known as Berkeley Logo, is a free, cross-platform implementation of standard Logo last released in 2009. George Mills at MIT used UCBLogo as the basis for MSWLogo, which is more refined and also free. Jim Muller wrote a book, The Great Logo Adventure, which was a complete Logo manual and which used MSWLogo as the demonstration language. MSWLogo has evolved into FMSLogo.

First released from 2000 onwards

- aUCBLogo is a rewrite and enhancement of UCBLogo.
- Imagine Logo is a successor of Comenius Logo, implemented in 2000. The English version was released by Logotron Ltd. in 2001.
- LibreLogo is an extension to some versions of LibreOffice. Released in 2012, it is written in Python. It allows vector graphics to be written in Writer.
- Logo3D is a three-dimensional version of Logo.
- POOL is a dialect of Logo with object-oriented extensions, implemented in 2014. POOL programs are compiled and run in the graphical IDE on Microsoft Windows. A simplified, cross-platform environment is available for systems supporting .NET Framework.
- QLogo is an open-source and cross-platform rewrite of UCBLogo with nearly full UCB compatibility that uses hardware-accelerated graphics.
- Lynx is an online version of Logo developed by Logo Computer Systems Inc. It can run a large number of turtles, supports animation, parallel processes, colour, and collision detection.
- LogoMor is an open-source online 3D Logo interpreter based on JavaScript and p5.js. It supports 3D drawings, animations, multimedia, 3D models, and various tools. It also includes a fully-featured code editor based on CodeMirror
- LbyM is an open-source online Logo interpreter based on JavaScript, created and actively developed (as of 2021) for Sonoma State University's Learning by Making program. It features traditional Logo programming, connectivity with a customized microcontroller, and integration with a modern code editor.
- Various Visual Studio Code extensions for the Logo programming language are available on the VS Code Marketplace with varying support (syntax highlighter, code completion, integrated interpreter, debugger with live turtle graphics preview).

== Influence ==
Logo was a primary influence on the Smalltalk programming language. It is also the main influence on the Etoys educational programming environment and language, which is essentially a Logo variant written in Squeak (itself a variant of Smalltalk). Logo influenced the procedure/method model in AgentSheets and AgentCubes to program agents similar to the notion of a turtle in Logo. Logo provided the underlying language for Boxer. Boxer was developed at University of California, Berkeley and MIT and is based on a literacy model, making it easier to use for nontechnical people.

KTurtle is a variation of Logo implemented at Qt for the KDE environment loosely based on Logo.

Two more results of Logo's influence are Kojo, a variant of Scala, and Scratch, a visual, drag-and-drop language which runs in a web browser.
