= Brian Harvey (lecturer) =

American computer scientist

Brian K. Harvey
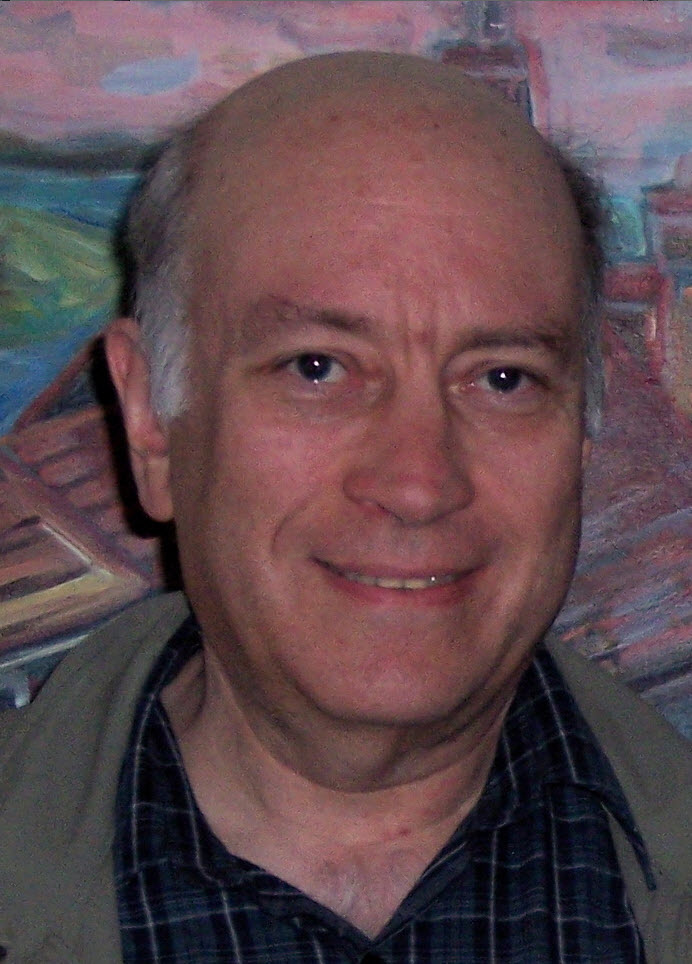
- Born: 1949 (age 76–77)
- Education: MIT; Stanford University; UC Berkeley; New College of California
- Known for: UCBLogo; Snap!
- Children: 1
- Awards: Berkeley Distinguished Teaching Award [1995]; Diane S. McEntyre Award for Excellence in Teaching Computer Science [1997]; Jim and Donna Gray Award for Excellence in Undergraduate Teaching of Computer Science [1999]
- Scientific career
- Fields: Mathematics; Computer science; Education; Psychology
- Workplaces: University of California, Berkeley
- Thesis: The high school computer center: educational goals in theory and practice (philosophy, programming, moral) (1985; 41 years ago)
- Website: people.eecs.berkeley.edu/~bh

Brian Keith Harvey (born 1949) is a former Lecturer SOE of computer science at University of California, Berkeley. He and his students developed an educational programming language named UCBLogo which is free and open-source software, a dialect of the language Logo, as an interpreter, for learners. He now works on Snap!.

== Education ==
He received his B.S. in mathematics at Massachusetts Institute of Technology (MIT), 1969, a M.S. in computer science, Stanford University, 1975, and a Ph.D. in science and mathematics education, University of California, Berkeley, 1985. He also received a M.A. in clinical psychology, New College of California, 1990.

== Work ==
Until retiring in July 2013, Harvey taught introductory (lower-division) computer science courses at Berkeley, and CS 195, Social Implications of Computing. He was also involved in the development of the language Logo for the use in K-12 education.

Together with the German programmer Jens Mönig, Harvey designed the programming language Build Your Own Blocks (BYOB), and its successor Snap!, an extended version of the language Scratch, which added higher-order functions and true object-oriented inheritance for first-class sprites. With CS10, The Beauty and Joy of Computing at Berkeley he co-established the first course to use BYOB and spread it to other colleges and high schools.

== Selected publications ==
- Harvey, Brian K.; Wright, Matthew (December 1993). Simply Scheme: Introducing Computer Science. Cambridge, Massachusetts: MIT Press. ISBN 9780262082266.
- Harvey, Brian K. (March 1997). Volume 1: Symbolic Computing. Computer Science Logo Style. Vol. 1. Cambridge, Massachusetts: MIT Press. ISBN 0-262-58148-5.
- Harvey, Brian K. (March 1997). Volume 2: Advanced Techniques. Computer Science Logo Style. Vol. 2. Cambridge, Massachusetts: MIT Press. ISBN 0-262-58149-3.
- Harvey, Brian K. (March 1997). Volume 3: Beyond Programming. Computer Science Logo Style. Vol. 3. Cambridge, Massachusetts: MIT Press. ISBN 0-262-58150-7.
