= Turtle (robot) =

1940s class of educational robots

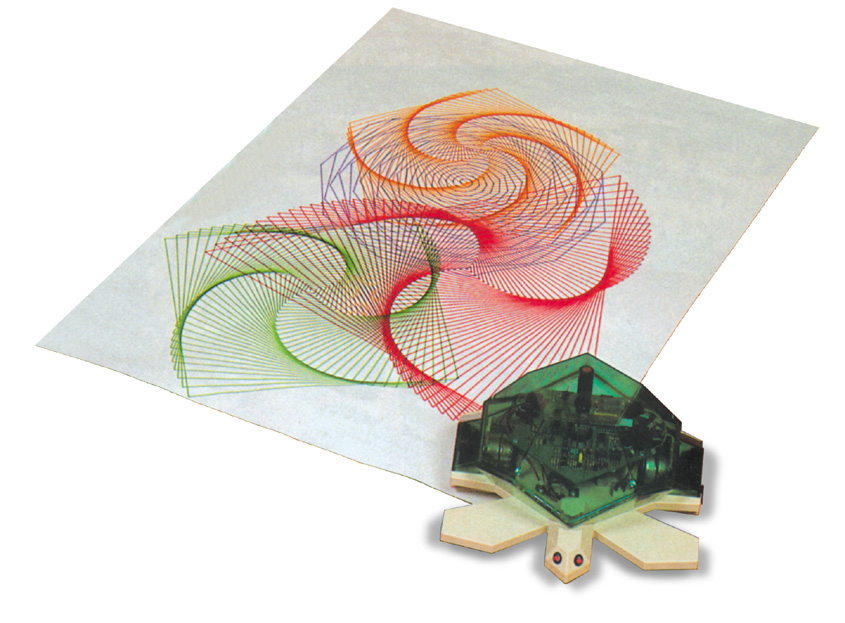
The Valiant Turtle was sold from 1983 to 2011. It was controlled via infrared.

Turtles are a class of educational robots designed originally in the late 1940s (largely under the auspices of researcher William Grey Walter) and used in computer science and mechanical engineering training. These devices are traditionally built low to the ground with a roughly hemispheric (sometimes transparent) shell and a power train capable of a very small turning radius. The robots are often equipped with sensor devices that aid in avoiding obstacles and, if the robot is sufficiently sophisticated, allow it some perception of its environment. Turtle robots are commercially available and are common projects for robotics hobbyists.

Turtle robots are closely associated with the work of Seymour Papert and the common use of the Logo programming language in computer education of the 1980s. Turtles specifically designed for use with Logo systems often come with pen mechanisms allowing the programmer to create a design on a large sheet of paper. The original Logo turtle, built by Paul Wexelblat at BBN, was named "Irving" and was demonstrated at the former Muzzey Junior High in Lexington, Massachusetts. "Irving" contained bump sensors and could give audio feedback with a bell. The development of the robotic Logo turtle led to the use of the term to describe the cursor in video screen implementations of the language and its turtle graphics package.

== See also ==
- BEAM robotics, the branch of robotics pioneered in part by William Grey Walter, specializing in autonomous devices using simple analog control systems
- iRobot Create and its predecessor Roomba, turtle-like robots originally designed for domestic use
- Player Project, a free robotics suite
- Curses (computer game), an interactive fiction game by Graham Nelson that includes a voice-operated turtle in one of its more difficult puzzles
- Unicycle cart, for a mathematical model of the dynamics of a turtle robot
