= Seymour Papert =

American computer scientist (1928–2016)

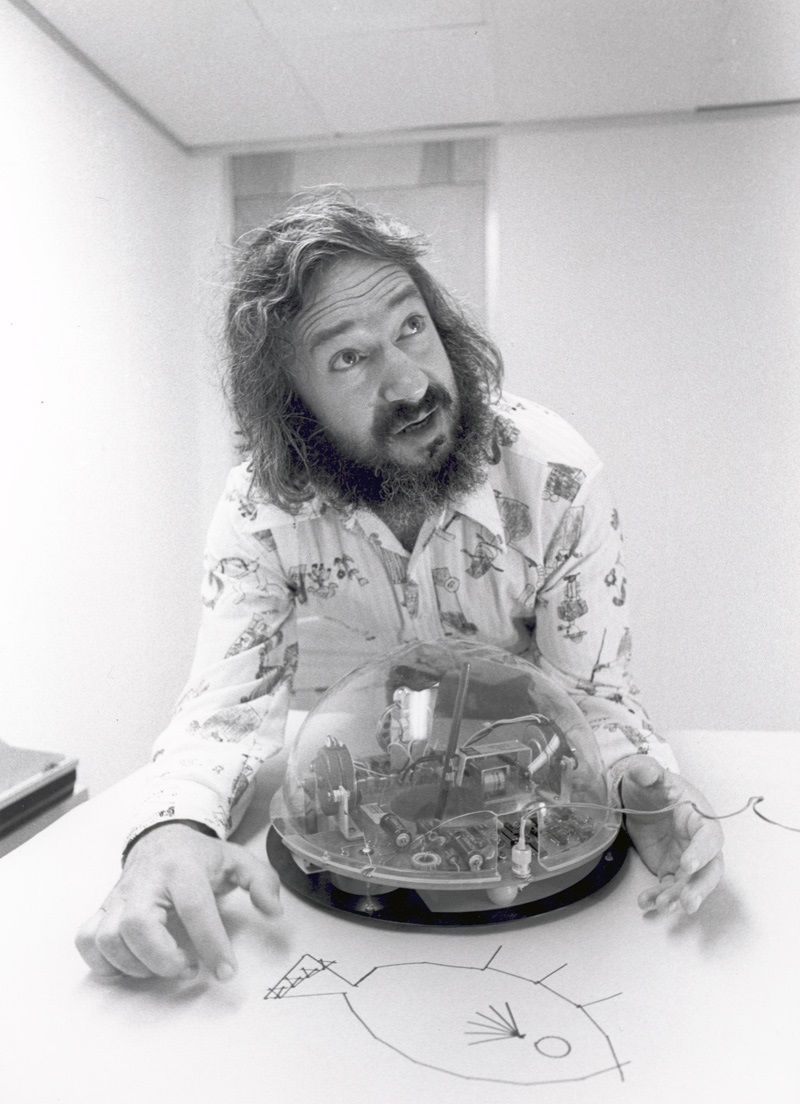
- Papert with a Turtle robot
- Born: Seymour Aubrey Papert; 29 February 1928; Pretoria, Union of South Africa
- Died: 31 July 2016 (aged 88); Blue Hill, Maine, U.S.
- Education: University of the Witwatersrand (BA, PhD); University of Cambridge (PhD)
- Known for: Perceptrons; Artificial intelligence; Logo programming language; One Laptop per Child; Papert's principle
- Spouses: Dona Strauss; Androula Henriques; Sherry Turkle; Suzanne Massie
- Scientific career
- Fields: Cognitive science Education; Mathematics; Computer science
- Workplaces: Massachusetts Institute of Technology; University of Geneva; University of Paris; National Physical Laboratory
- Theses: Sequential Convergence in Lattices with Special Reference To Modular and Subgroup Lattices (1952); The Lattices of Logic and Topology (1960)
- Doctoral advisor: Frank Smithies
- Doctoral students: Idit Harel Caperton; Carl Hewitt; Mitchel Resnick; Edwina Rissland; David Williamson Shaffer; Gerald Jay Sussman; Terry Winograd
- Website: papert.org

Seymour Aubrey Papert (/ˈpæpərt/; 29 February 1928 – 31 July 2016) was a South African-born American mathematician, computer scientist, and educator, who spent most of his career teaching and researching at the Massachusetts Institute of Technology. He was one of the pioneers of artificial intelligence, and of the constructionist movement in education. With Marvin Minsky he wrote Perceptrons (1969), an influential analysis of early neural networks. He was co-inventor, with Wally Feurzeig and Cynthia Solomon, of the Logo programming language.

== Early years and education ==
Papert was born in Pretoria in 1928 to a Jewish family. His father was an entomologist and Papert derived his interest in learning from the tsetse-fly field research he and his father conducted together. He attended the University of the Witwatersrand, receiving a Bachelor of Arts degree in philosophy in 1949 followed by a PhD in mathematics in 1952. He then went on to receive a second doctorate, also in mathematics, at the University of Cambridge (1959), supervised by Frank Smithies.

== Career ==
Papert worked as a researcher in a variety of places, including St. John's College, Cambridge, the Henri Poincaré Institute at the University of Paris, the University of Geneva, and the National Physical Laboratory in London before becoming a research associate at MIT in 1963. He held this position until 1967, when he became professor of applied math and was made co-director of the MIT Artificial Intelligence Laboratory by its founding director Professor Marvin Minsky, until 1981; he also served as Cecil and Ida Green professor of education at MIT from 1974 to 1981.

In 1985, Papert and Minsky were founding faculty of the MIT Media Laboratory. In 1989, when Lego funded a chair there, Papert became its first holder as LEGO Professor of Learning Research; the chair was renamed the LEGO Papert Professorship in 1998, after he became professor emeritus.

== Research ==
Papert worked on learning theories, and was known for focusing on the impact of new technologies on learning in general, and in schools as learning organizations in particular.

=== Constructionism ===
At MIT, Papert went on to create the Epistemology and Learning Research Group at the MIT Architecture Machine Group which later became the MIT Media Lab. Here, he was the developer of a theory on learning called constructionism, built upon the work of Jean Piaget in constructivist learning theories. Papert had worked with Piaget at the University of Geneva from 1958 to 1963 and was one of Piaget's protégés; Piaget himself once said that "no one understands my ideas as well as Papert". Papert has rethought how schools should work, based on these theories of learning.

=== Logo ===
Papert used Piaget's work in his development of the Logo programming language while at MIT. He created Logo as a tool to improve the way children think and solve problems. A small mobile robot called the "Logo Turtle" was developed, and children were shown how to use it to solve simple problems in an environment of play. A main purpose of the Logo Foundation research group is to strengthen the ability to learn knowledge. Papert insisted a simple language or program that children can learn—like Logo—can also have advanced functionality for expert users.

=== Other work ===
As part of his work with technology, Papert was a proponent of the Knowledge Machine. Along with Nicholas Negroponte and Alan Kay, he was one of the co-founders of the One Laptop Per Child initiative in 2004 to manufacture and distribute The Children's Machine in developing nations. The project went on to produce over three million laptops for children in more than 40 countries.

Papert also collaborated with the construction toy manufacturer Lego on their Logo-programmable Lego Mindstorms robotics kits, which were named after his groundbreaking 1980 book.

In the late 1990s, Papert moved to Maine, where in 1999 he founded the Learning Barn and the Seymour Papert Institute. He set up a learning laboratory at the Maine Youth Center and assisted with the state’s program to provide a laptop to every seventh- and eighth-grader.

A curated archive of Papert's articles, speeches, and interviews may be found on a website dedicated to Papert at: The Daily Papert.

== Personal life ==
Papert was a political and anti-apartheid activist during his student years in South Africa. He subsequently chose self exile. He was a leading figure in the revolutionary socialist circle around Socialist Review while living in London in the 1950s.

Papert was married four times; first to Dona Strauss, and later to Androula Henriques. Papert's third wife was MIT professor Sherry Turkle, with whom he wrote the influential paper "Epistemological Pluralism and the Revaluation of the Concrete".

In his final 24 years, Papert was married to Suzanne Massie, who was a Russian scholar and author of Pavlovsk: The Life of a Russian Palace and Land of the Firebird.

=== Injury and death ===
Papert (then aged 78) received a serious brain injury when struck by a motor scooter on 5 December 2006 while crossing the street with colleague Uri Wilensky when they were both attending the 17th International Commission on Mathematical Instruction (ICMI) Study conference in Hanoi, Vietnam. He underwent emergency surgery to remove a blood clot at the French Hospital of Hanoi before being transferred in a complex operation by Swiss Air Ambulance Bombardier Challenger Jet to Boston, Massachusetts, where he spent approximately four weeks in intensive care. He was moved to a hospital closer to his home in January 2007, but then developed sepsis which damaged a heart valve, which was later replaced.

By 2008 he had returned home, could think and communicate clearly and walk "almost unaided", but still had "some complicated speech problems" and was in receipt of extensive rehabilitation support. His rehabilitation team used some of the very principles of experiential, hands-on learning, that he had pioneered.

Papert died at his home in Blue Hill, Maine, on 31 July 2016. His survivors included his wife, his daughter Artemis Papert, three stepchildren and two siblings.

== Awards, honours, and legacy ==
Papert's work has been used by other researchers in the fields of education and computer science. He influenced the work of Uri Wilensky in the design of NetLogo and collaborated with him on the study of knowledge restructurations, as well as the work of Andrea diSessa and the development of "dynaturtles". In 1981, Papert along with several others in the Logo group at MIT, started Logo Computer Systems Inc. (LCSI), of which he was board chair for over 20 years. Working with LCSI, Papert designed a number of award-winning programs, including LogoWriter and Lego/Logo (marketed as Lego Mindstorms). He also influenced the research of Idit Harel Caperton, coauthoring articles and the book Constructionism, and chairing the advisory board of the company MaMaMedia. He also influenced Alan Kay and the Dynabook concept, and worked with Kay on various projects.

Papert won a Guggenheim fellowship in 1980, a Marconi International fellowship in 1981, the Software Publishers Association Lifetime Achievement Award in 1994, and the Smithsonian Award from Computerworld in 1997. Papert has been called by Marvin Minsky "the greatest of all living education theorists".

MIT President L. Rafael Reif summarized Papert's lifetime of accomplishments: "With a mind of extraordinary range and creativity, Seymour Papert helped revolutionize at least three fields, from the study of how children make sense of the world, to the development of artificial intelligence, to the rich intersection of technology and learning. The stamp he left on MIT is profound. Today, as MIT continues to expand its reach and deepen its work in digital learning, I am particularly grateful for Seymour's groundbreaking vision, and we hope to build on his ideas to open doors to learners of all ages, around the world."

In 2016 Papert's alma mater, the University of the Witwatersrand, awarded him the degree of Doctor of Science in Engineering, honoris causa.
