= Richard Culatta =

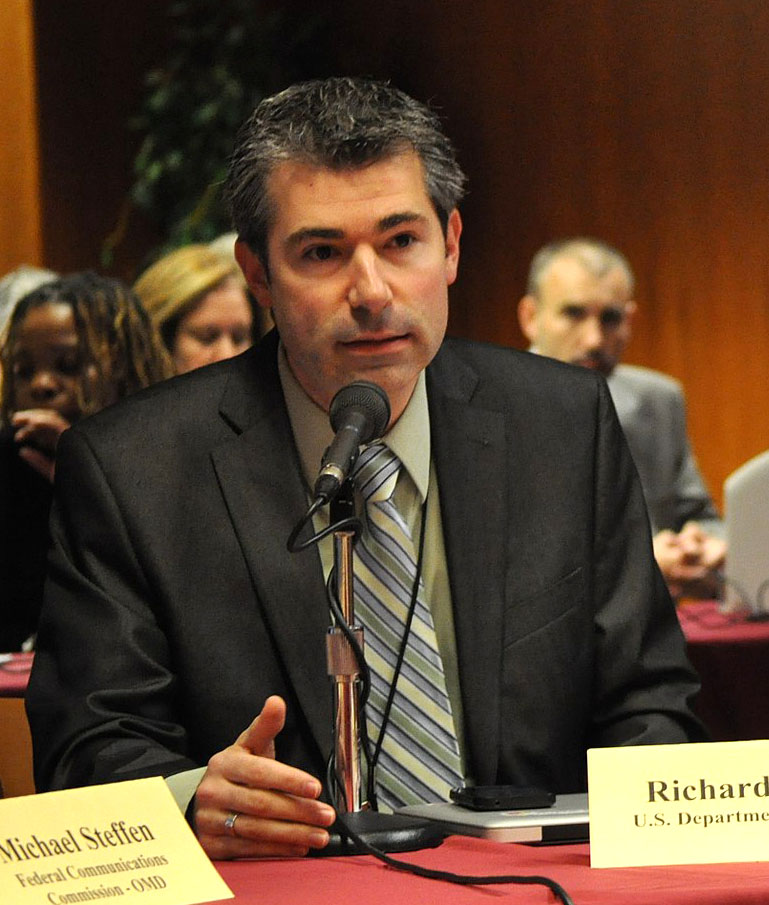

Richard E. Culatta is the CEO of the International Society for Transforming Education (formerly ISTE and ASCD). Prior to holding this position, he was the chief innovation officer for the state of Rhode Island and the director of the Office of Educational Technology for the U.S. Department of Education (2013-2015).

== Biography ==
Richard Culatta grew up in Rhode Island. He received a bachelor's degree in Spanish teaching and a master's in instructional design from Brigham Young University. He is the son of Richard and Barbara Culatta, both educators and widely-published researchers in the field of communication disorders. Culatta is passionate about creating healthy conditions for young people using technology and is the author of the book Digital for Good: Raising Kids to Thrive in an Online World.

== Career ==
=== Early career ===
Culatta began his career as a high school Spanish teacher. During the early 2000s, he was a technology advisor for the David O. McKay School of Education at Brigham Young University, helping redesign the technology component of the school's teacher preparation program. During this time, he also served as the director of operations at the Rose Education Foundation, which helped create and operate schools in rural Guatemala. He worked at CIA University overseeing learning innovation, then became an education policy advisor to U.S. Senator Patty Murray (D-WA).

=== U.S. Department of Education Office of Educational Technology ===
Culatta was appointed to be a Senior Advisor to the U.S. Secretary of Education and Director of the Office of Educational Technology from 2013 to 2015. During his tenure, the office ran the #GoOpen campaign, which encouraged schools to use learning materials with open copyright licenses and updated regulations to require all educational materials produced with federal grant money be open licensed. Culatta's team led President Obama's ConnectEd Initiative which resulted in an increase from 15% of schools having broadband access in 2009 to 95% of schools having broadband access by the end of the Obama administration. As director, Culatta also led the creation of the 2016 National Educational Technology Plan.

=== State of Rhode Island ===
Culatta left the Office of Educational Technology to become the Chief Innovation Officer of the State of Rhode Island. During his tenure, Rhode Island was used as a "lab" state for education and government reform. A major focus was the personalized learning initiative, which aims to create learning experiences that are dynamic and individualized for each student. Under Culatta's leadership, Rhode Island also became the first state to offer computer science in every K–12 school.

=== ISTE+ASCD ===
Currently, Culatta is the CEO of ISTE+ASCD. This nonprofit creates standards for using technology in education. A current focus for Culatta and ISTE is finding ways to use technology to close equity gaps and redefine Digital Citizenship. ISTE+ASCD is also the leading provider of teacher training and thought leadership around the use of AI in education. In 2023 ISTE merged with ASCD to help ensure all students have access to high quality learning experiences.

== Publications ==
- Digital for Good: Raising Kids to Thrive in an Online World, Harvard Business Review Press, July 2021.
- Culatta, Richard, and Katrina Stevens. "There's an App for That. Well, Maybe." Medium. August 21, 2015.
- U.S. Department of Education, Office of Educational Technology, Ed Tech Developer’s Guide, Washington, D.C., 2015.
- U.S. Department of Education, Office of Educational Technology, Future Ready Schools: Building Technology Infrastructure for Learning, Washington, D.C., 2014.
