= Gary Bitter =

American educational technology researcher

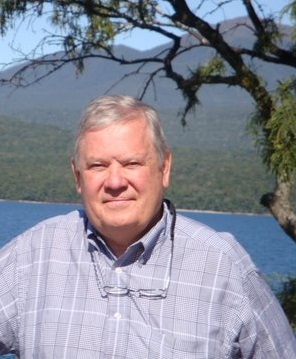
- Occupations: Researcher, author, academic and educator.

Academic background
- Education: B.S., Mathematics Education; M.A., Mathematics; Ph.D., Mathematics and Computer Science Education
- Alma mater: Kansas State University; Emporia State University; University of Denver
- Thesis: Computer Applications Related to Student Achievement

Gary Bitter (born Susank, Kansas) is an American researcher, teacher, and author focusing on educational technology. He is Professor of Educational Technology and past Executive Director of Technology Based Learning and Research at Arizona State University. He was a founding board member of the International Society for Technology in Education and served as its first elected president. He is the co-author of the National Technology Standards (NETS) which have been used extensively as a model for National and International Technology Standards.

Bitter's research has been focused educational technology, e-learning and how the use of technology impacts student performance. He has also done work for developing applications for education, and technology-based curricula. He has published over 200 articles and books.

In 2000, the International Society for Technology in Education (ISTE) awarded Bitter the Paul Pair Lifetime Technology Achievement Award. In 2006, The National Council of Teachers of Mathematics (NCTM) awarded him the Mathematics Education Trust Lifetime Achievement Award for Distinguished Service to Mathematics Education.

== Education ==
Bitter received a B.S. in Mathematics Education from Kansas State University in 1962 and an M.A. in Mathematics from Emporia State University in 1965. He then joined University of Denver where he completed his Ph.D. in Mathematics and Computer Science Education in 1970. His dissertation was entitled 'Computer Applications Related to Student Achievement'.

== Career ==
Bitter joined Arizona State University in 1970 as an assistant professor of Education, becoming associate professor in 1973 and full professor in 1977. From 1984 to 1985, he was appointed as the Acting Director of the Arizona State University Computer Institute. He served on the University Senate from 1972 to 1975 and 2007 to 2015 and was Chair of the University Financial Affairs Committee 1974-1975 and served on the University Executive Board 1974-1975 and University Senate Personnel Committee Chair 2011 to 2012.

In 1989, Bitter chaired the committee that merged the International Council for Computers in Education and International Association for Computing Education (formerly Association of Education Data Systems), which resulted in the formation of International Society for Technology in Education (ISTE). He became the first elected president of ISTE in 1990. He was the co-director of the National Educational Technology Standards project at ISTE. The project, funded by NASA and USDE in the late 1990s, developed national standards for the use of technology in education.

Bitter has been published in academic journals and written monthly columns for different magazines. Bitter has been on the Scientific Board of Computers in Human Behavior since 1995, and the Editorial Board of Journal of Research on Technology in Education since 1999. He was the Editor-in-Chief of the MacMillan Encyclopedia of Computers from 1990 to 1992, Executive Editor of Technology on Campus from 1988 to 1990, and Software Editor of Journal of Computers in Mathematics and Science Teaching from 1989 to 1993. He has been on the Editorial Board of the American Educational Research Journal (2003-2005), of Journal of Computers in Mathematics and Science Teaching (1981-1993), of Electronic Education (1984-1987). He wrote monthly columns for Educational Computer Magazine and Teacher Magazine in the early 1980s. He was Editor of the School Science and Mathematics from 1982-1988.

In 1980, Bitter founded the Microcomputers in Education Conference and served as its Director until 2000. He has been a consultant to many school districts as well as computer hardware and software companies.

== Research and work ==
Bitter's research has been focused educational technology, e-learning, emerging technologies, and how the use of technology impacts student performance. He has also done work for developing applications for education, and technology-based curricula. He has published over 200 articles and books.

In the beginning of his career in the 1970s, Bitter's research was focused on how computers can help in calculus: the applications of computers in calculus and the use of hand-held calculators in mathematics. Towards the mid-1970s, he also conducted research on teaching and learning of the metric system.

As microcomputers began to make their way to educational institutions in the early 1980’s, Bitter conducted research on the use of microcomputers in education. Most of his work in this area dealt with training teachers to use computers and the right software and hardware for microcomputers to be used in schools. His research also focused on how teachers can be evaluated for computer literacy. Later he conducted research on how the computers can most effectively be introduced in institutions. In 1982, Bitter wrote an important classic series of articles entitled The Road to Computer Literacy that was published in five parts in Electronic Learning. Bitter lead a team to develop the Texas Instruments Super Speak & Math as well as providing input to the Texas Instruments Math Explorer Calculator (one of the first fraction calculators). He was the co-chair of the committee that developed the online Migrant Math standards for the United States (1971-1981).

In the 1990s, Bitter's research focus began moving towards long distance teaching and the use of interactive multimedia in education and professional development. He has developed many multimedia programs focused on training teachers including: ASU-NETS Digital Video Library (DVL), Math-ed-ology and Understanding Teaching. Some of his research in the 1990s focused on developing programs to increase technological capabilities of Hispanic women. In 1992, Bitter wrote a paper entitled Technology and minorities: A local program aimed at increasing technological capabilities of Hispanic women. That paper led to a research line to assist the Navajo, Havasupai, Salt River, Gila, and Hopi Indian reservations with mathematics and technology education. He developed the Hispanic Math Project for migrant students as well as The e-Learning Network to train poor or geographically isolated adults, via the Internet, for financially promising careers in computer networking and information technology. He developed the Hispanic Math Project, an interactive English-Spanish Mathematics program for elementary-middle school students.

Later, Bitter's research focused on the use of e-learning and video modules in education. In the mid-2000s, he began studying service-oriented computing and its applications in education. Bitter conducted a three-year study of the program, The Writing Road to Reading in 2006-2010.

In the early 2010s, Bitter's research began moving towards the use of mobile applications for education. He has developed several educational Android and iOS applications for Math Readiness, Algebra, Geometry, Data Analysis and Probability, Number Recognition and Math Coaching. In the 2010s, his research was focused on personalized, adaptive and augmented learning in the teaching and learning of mathematics. In 2014 he designed iOS and Android app Stress-Less TRE for author David Berceli.

Bitter's research and development work has been funded by numerous grants as well as several equipment grants from Cisco, Intel, Apple, IBM, Fund for the Improvement of Postsecondary Education (FIPSE), United States Department of Education and the National Science Foundation (NSF).

== Awards and honors ==
- 1970-1979 - American Men and Women of Science
- 1975 - Community Leaders and Noteworthy Americans
- 1975, 1979, 1981, 1993 - Outstanding Children's Book, National Science Teachers Association
- 1976 - National Migrant Educator, Migrant Education News
- 1984 - International Educator, UNICEF
- 1985 - Outstanding Faculty Member, Arizona State University College of Education
- 1987 - Distinguished Alumnus, Emporia State University
- 1989 - Masters of Innovation, Zenith Data Systems
- 1989 - Outstanding Technology Educator of the Year, International Society for Technology in Education
- 1990 - Affirmative Action Administrator of the Year, Arizona State University – Educational Media and Computers
- 1990 - Lifetime Achievement Award, International Society for Technology in Education ISTE
- 1994 - Distinguished Alumnus Award, Kansas State University
- 2000 - Outstanding Service Award, Arizona State University – College of Education
- 2000 - Paul Pair Lifetime Technology Achievement Award, International Society for Technology in Education
- 2001 - Faculty Achievement Award, Arizona State University
- 2006 - NCTM Lifetime Achievement Award, National Council of Teachers of Mathematics
- 2016 - Distinguished Mathematics Alumnus Award, Kansas State University

== Books ==
- BASIC for Beginners (1970)
- Computer Applications for Calculus (1972)
- Exploring with Metrics (1975)
- Teachers Handbook of Metric Activities (1977)
- Exploring with Solar Energy (1978)
- BASIC FIBEL (1980)
- Activities Handbook for Teaching with the Hand-Held Calculator (1980)
- Activities Handbook for Teaching with the Metric System (1981)
- McGraw Hill Mathematics (Elementary Math Series, K-8) (1981)
- Exploring with Computers (1981), (1983)
- Microcomputer Applications for Calculus (1983)
- Computers in Today's World (1984)
- Computer Literacy: Awareness, Applications and Programming (1988)
- Computacion: Fundamentos, Aplicaciones, Programacion (1988)
- Mathematics Methods for Elementary and Middle School: A Comprehensive Approach (1989)
- Microcomputers in Education Today (1989)
- Understanding and Using Microsoft Works for Windows (1991)
- Understanding and Using Microsoft Works on the Macintosh (1991)
- Understanding and Using Microsoft Works on the IBM PC (1991)
- West Computer Literacy System (1993)
- Understanding and Using Claris Works (1993)
- Quickstart ClarisWorks (1996)
- Using the Explorer Plus Calculator (1998)
- Working with Computers (1998)
- National Educational Technology Standards for Students (1998)
- Math•ed•ology (online) (1999)
- National Educational Technology Standards: Connecting Curriculum and Technology (2000)
- Mathematics Methods for Elementary and Middle School Teachers, 4th Ed. (2002)
- Hispanic Mathematics (online) (2003)
- Mathematics Methods for Elementary and Middle School Teachers, 7th Ed. (2002), (2004), (2005), (2008)
- Understanding Teaching (online) (2004)
- Using Technology in the Classroom, 6th Ed. (2002), (2005)
- Using Technology in the Classroom Brief Edition. (2006)
- Using Technology in the Classroom, 7th Ed. (2008)
- Chinese Simplified Translation of Using Technology in the Classroom, 7th Ed. (2012)
- ASU-NETS Digital Video Library (DVL) (2012)
