= Bert Glandon =

American educator and academic administrator

President of the College of Western Idaho
- In office 2002–2021

President of Arapahoe Community College
- In office 2002–2009

President of Treasure Valley Community College
- In office 1981–2002

Personal details
- Born: Seattle, Washington, U.S.
- Education: Western Washington University (BS, MA); Brigham Young University (EdD)

Bert Glandon is an American educator and academic administrator who served as the President of College of Western Idaho through May 2021, one of four community colleges in Idaho with main campus locations in Boise and Nampa.

== Early life and education ==
Glandon was born and raised in Seattle, Washington. He earned a bachelor's degree in business and a Master of Arts in communication from Western Washington University. He earned a Doctor of Education in educational administration from the David O. McKay School of Education at Brigham Young University.

== Career ==
After working in business, Glandon began traveling around the United States as the founder of his own consulting business. He served as the president of Treasure Valley Community College from 1981 to 2002 and Arapahoe Community College from 2002 to 2009. He was selected to serve as president of the College of Western Idaho in 2009. In 2019, a poll taken by college faculty found that a majority of instructors had no confidence in Glandon's leadership. In May 2019, Glandon received a raise and extension. Glandon retired from College of Western Idaho in May 2021.

== Retirement ==
Glandon announced his retirement February 18, 2021 as part of a special meeting of the CWI Board of Trustees. His last day will be May 15, 2021.
