= Tactile programming language =

Tactile programming is the specification, development, interaction with and interpretation of computer programs through a touch-centric interface. It is based on the ideas behind visual programming languages, particularly in the interaction and development of software with visual-graphic, rather than text-based, interpretations which can be "dragged-and-dropped" with a mouse in order to develop the software's functionality.

However, tactile programming applies the visual programming paradigm within a touch-centric framework:

- the widgets which are dragged-and-dropped to create software programs are expanded to better reflect touch interaction rather than mouse interaction
- other secondary input devices for software programming may be practically replaced by computer-rendered, virtual visual-graphic equivalents, such as a virtual keyboard.
- concurrently-running emulator runtimes for same or similar operating systems as the one on which the software-based tactile programming interface resides may be used to test the stability and functionality of code without risk of data or interface loss.

At the moment, the only example which exist of tactile programming IDEs is "Visual AgenTalk", which is implemented within AgentSheets. Similar drag and drop programming can be found in the Etoys language (part of Squeak), in Alice and in Scratch.

== Notes ==
- Tactile Programming: A Unified Manipulation Paradigm Supporting Program Comprehension, Composition and Sharing (1996)
- Visual AgenTalk
- Towards Ubiquitous End-User Programming
