= ConnectEd Initiative =

ConnectEd is a United States Federal Government Initiative that aims to increase internet connectivity and technology in all public schools to enhance learning. The ConnectEd initiative is funded through Title IV Part A of the Every Student Succeeds Act (ESSA), which designates specific monies for the effective use of technology in schools. The 2016 National Education Technology Plan aligns with ConnectEd as a published action plan to meet these goals of technology integration and connectivity.

The ConnectEd Initiative was announced by President Obama in June 2013 during a speech Mooresville, North Carolina as a plan to increase broadband Internet access in schools, to partner with private companies for affordable devices and innovation, and to redesign school curriculum to better meet the needs of the digital age.

To meet ConnectEd's goals of upgrading connectivity, training teachers, and encouraging private sector innovation, The United States Department of Education and the Alliance for Excellent Education partnered on Future Ready Schools.

== Rationale ==
Under the Obama administration, the Federal Communications Commission (FCC) created the National Broadband Plan (United States) (NBP) to increase economic competitiveness and foster in-demand digital social interaction access within the United States. This plan was a response to the growing digital divide by socioeconomic status. According to the American Community Survey in 2013, 90% of households that have at least one college-educated parent had internet access, compared to less than 50% of households that had at least one parent with less than a high school diploma had the internet. This lack of access to internet at home can impact ability to perform on assessments, complete online assignments, and apply for jobs. School districts with less resources also experience the digital divide. The 2013 EducationSuperHighway report stated school districts who are affluent were "twice as likely as moderate-income school districts and three times as likely as low-income school districts to meet the FCC's 100 kbps per student goal."

== Timeline ==
Shortly after Obama's 2013 speech unrolling the ConnectEd initiative, over 1,000 educators signed a petition to expand internet access in schools in November 2013.

In November 2014, over 100 superintendents from selected by the White House were invited to the White House by the Department of Education for the ConnectEd Superintendents Summit and pledge their commitment to enacting ConnectEd. The purpose of the summit was to share ideas about technology education and sign the Future Ready District Pledge. Any public school district can sign and commit to the Future Ready District Pledge to receive additional supports, guidance, and resources about how to transition into digital learning.

In order to achieve the goals of the ConnectEd Initiative, the Alliance for Excellent Education, McGraw-Hill Education, AT&T, and Metri Group collaborated to devise the Future Ready Framework to serve as a roadmap towards digital learning. This roadmap can be used by schools to transition into digital learning. The seven gears of the Framework include Curriculum, Instruction, and Assessment, Use of Space and Time, Robust Infrastructure, Data and Privacy, Community Partnerships, Personalized Learning, and Budget and Resources.

In April 2015, the ConnectEd Library Challenge was announced. This challenge urges public libraries to partner with local officials and school leaders so every child is able to own a library card. In conjunction with the ConnectEd Library Challenge, Obama also announced his e-Books Initiative in the same month. The e-Books Initiative calls for students ages 4–18 to access world-class digital library.

In November 2015, superintendents met at regional summits to create plans using the free interactive planning dashboard, which included a district technology assessment, job-embedded opportunities for personalized learning, and technology policies and practices. The final goal was to use the Framework to make an action plan to bring home to their districts for implementation.

Regional summits continued to be held in year 2016 with plans for regional summits to continue years into the future. Sample agendas [1] include creating plans for implementation at schools, creating a culture of "Future Ready Schools" within schools, districts, and communities, and share insights from current work.

President Obama announced the ConnectEd goal "to provide 99 percent of American students with access to next-generation broadband in their classrooms and libraries by 2018."

== Funding ==
Funding for ConnectEd comes from the U.S. Government in conjunction with private companies such as Esri, Adobe Systems, Autodesk, and others who have provided up to $2 billion to give schools access to "devices, free software, teacher professional development, and home wireless connectivity." From 2014 to 2016, the Federal Communications Commission's E-Rate program has funded $2 billion to increase high-speed connectivity. The United States Department of Agriculture (USDA) also provides rural schools with an additional $10 million for distance learning. Districts who have signed the "Future Ready District Pledge" have the flexibility in Title I, II, and III funds through the Every Student Succeeds Act to spend towards meeting the ConnectEd goals.

== Overview ==
=== Upgrading Connectivity ===
The ConnectEd initiative aims to increase internet connectivity in schools, including high-speed, wired or wireless internet, and broadband capabilities. Increasing bandwidth within schools is a priority of the ConnectEd initiative because as of 2016, 23% of schools do not have enough bandwidth to meet their digital learning needs. This lack of available, sufficient bandwidth has also been called The Connectivity Gap. Furthermore, MDR's State of K-12 Report in 2015 notes that 99% of school district's don't have the bandwidth capabilities that will be crucial over the next five years.

In order to improve school connectivity, schools must meet three prerequisite goals: have access to fiber optic connections, have affordable bandwidth, and have classrooms capable of a robust Wi-Fi connection. The US Department of Education suggests that schools have of minimum connectivity speed of 100 Mbit/s with a speed of 1 Gbit/s per 1000 students. The Broadband Technology Opportunities Program (BTOP), funded through the American Recovery and Reinvestment Act of 2009, has aided in building technology infrastructure in underserved areas and rural communities throughout the United States; ConnectEd builds on these efforts, focusing especially on rural areas. President Barack Obama stated in speech in Durham, Oklahoma, "while high-speed Internet access is a given, is assumed for millions of Americans, it's still out of reach for too many people, especially in low income and rural communities." In order to encourage investment in rural broadband, Obama's Administration has also continue to support the FCC's Universal Service Fund (USF), which has invested over $25 billion in funding since 2008.

President Obama has asked the Federal Communications Commission (FCC) to leverage the existing E-Rate program and increase the current E-Rate funding cap, as well as use the expertise of the National Telecommunications and Information Administration (NTIA) to deliver this connectivity to states, districts, and schools.

=== Training Teachers ===
In order to improve student outcomes, the ConnectEd initiative pairs the Department of Education with states and school districts to create funding plans through Title II of the Elementary and Secondary Education Act for technology professional development. The goal of this professional development is to keep teachers on track with current technological demands. Title IV of the Elementary and Secondary Education Act funds also pay for professional development on computer-based assessmentcomputer-based assessments. In using computer-based assessments, teachers should be able to have more immediate feedback on student learning.

The U.S. Department of Education and the Office of Educational Technology created a Professional Learning Toolkit called Future Ready Schools: Empowering Educators Through Professional Learning to assess district readiness for technological change. This toolkit contains five steps to build capacity in educator practice with the hopes of increasing student outcomes. The first step in the toolkit recommends that school districts set up district leadership team and collect pre-existing technology plans. Schools districts must then devise S.M.A.R.T. goals (Specific, Measurable, Attainable, Realistic, Timely) focused on professional learning and refine them using the Professional Learning Strategies Self-Assessment Tool created by the Toolkit. Once refined, school districts can implement an action plan for professional learning. Finally, school districts assess the effectiveness of their professional learning plan for staff and students based on evidence such as satisfaction of participants, the knowledge they gain, and whether student outcomes increase or not.

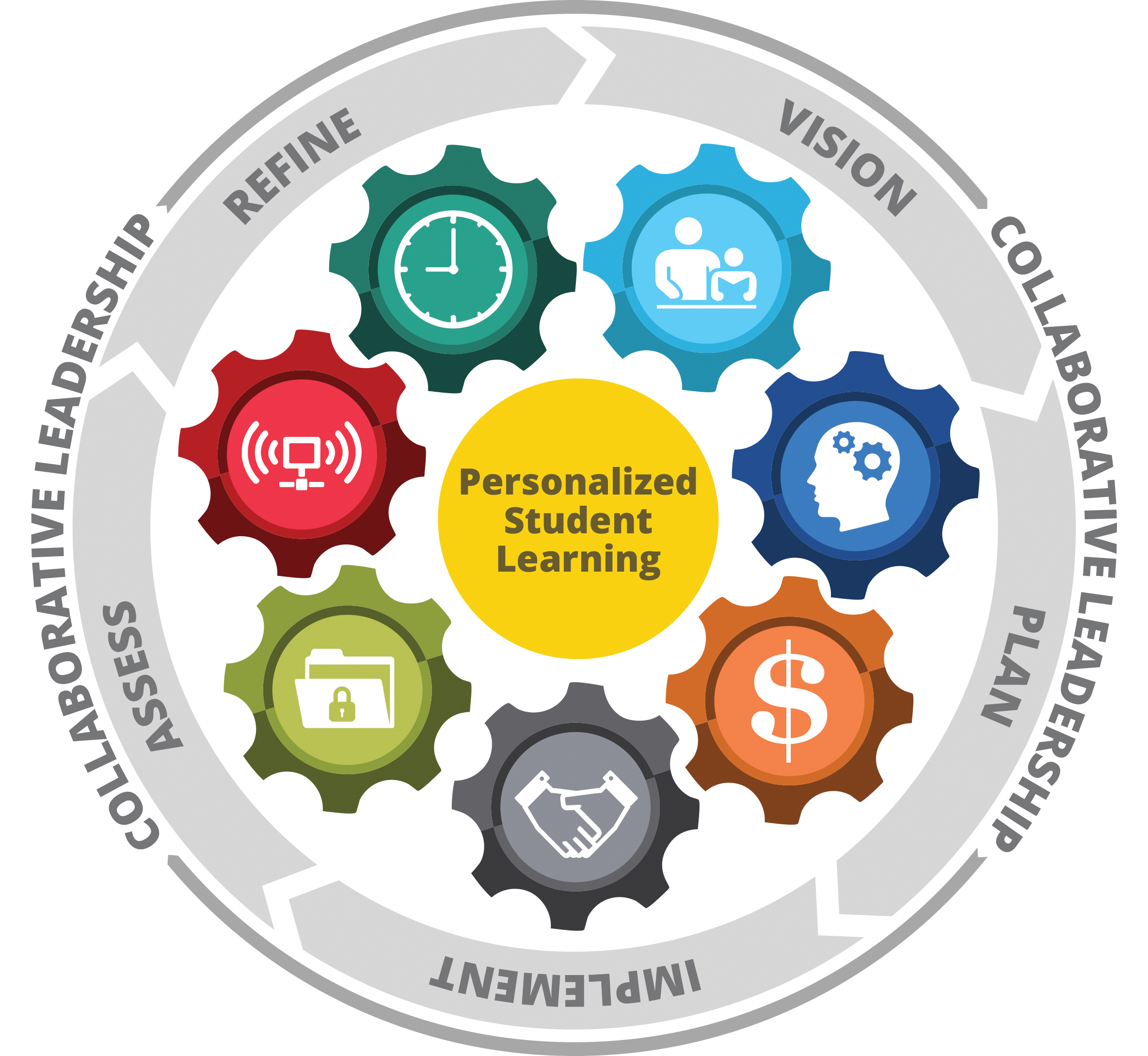
The Seven Gears of Future Ready Schools Framework

With the support of the U.S. Department of Education, the Alliance for Excellent Education created the free, online Future Ready Schools Framework and the Future Ready Schools Interactive Planning Dashboard. District leadership teams use the Interactive Planning Dashboard to plan technology use and assess progress over time, whereas the Future Ready Schools Framework "provides the roadmap for a successful digital transformation." There are 7 Gears in the Future Ready Schools Framework:

- Curriculum, Instruction, and Assessment
- Personalized Professional Learning
- Robust Infrastructure
- Data and Privacy
- Community Partnerships
- Budget and Resources
- Use of Space and Time"

These free, online tools are for teachers and district leaders to begin their path into becoming a Future Ready School as well as to continue professional development and to improve their current work in ConnectEd.

In addition to these professional development tools, in-person professional development through Future Ready Schools is available in regional summits. These regional summits are free of charge for district leadership teams.

Another avenue for districts to become "Future Ready Schools" is by garnering support from the International Center for Leadership in Education (which is a Future Ready Schools Coalition Partner). This group will help schools integrate technology and utilize digital learning in classroom through building a professional learning plans, supporting teachers in digital literacy, increasing 1:1 initiatives, and personalizing student learning.

=== Encouraging Private Sector Innovation ===
ConnectEd calls on the private sector to provide devices and/or professional development on technology use at a free or discounted rate for schools to be able to meet the ConnectEd initiative with little extra cost. The charge from ConnectEd is have quality devices in schools as well as price-competitive educational software. As such, private sectors are encouraged to supply devices and software for schools at free to low-cost, with choice of the local district educators for type of devices. These new technologies allow for students to be engaged in digital learning in the classroom.

EdX and Coursera have committed to provide free virtual professional development, with specifically EdX allowing free coursework from top universities available to educators.

"Participating hardware, software, wireless and professional development companies include:

- Adobe Systems, has begun providing more than $300 million worth of free software to teachers and students, including Photoshop and Premiere Elements for creative projects; Presenter and Captivate to amplify e-learning; EchoSign for school workflow; and a range of teacher training resources
- Apple Inc., has donated $100 million in iPads, MacBooks, and other products, along with content and professional development tools to enrich learning in disadvantaged U.S. schools
- AT&T, has donated $100 million to give 50,000 middle and high school students in Title I districts free Internet connectivity for educational devices over their wireless network for three years
- Autodesk, is making its 3D design program "Design the Future" available for free in every secondary school in the U.S. — more than $250 million in value
- Coursera, which is providing no-cost online professional development at every school district over the next two years, including opportunities for teachers to earn Coursera's completion certificates that may be used for continuing education credits
- edX, is providing all students with free access to online Advanced Placement-level courses offered through edX by partner institutions like UC Berkeley, MIT, and Georgetown in addition to more than 40 other courses and modules
- Esri, is providing $1 billion worth of free access to ArcGIS Online Organization accounts – the same Geographic Information Systems mapping technology used by government and business – to every K-12 school in America to allow students to map and analyze data
- Microsoft, has launched a substantial affordability program open to all U.S. public schools by deeply discounting the price of its Windows operating system, which will decrease the price of Windows-based devices
- O'Reilly Media, which is partnering with Safari Books Online to make more than $100 million in educational content and tools available for free to every school in the U.S.
- Prezi, is providing $100 million in Edu Pro licenses for high schools and all educators across America
- The Sprint Corporation will provide one million high-school students who do not have the Internet at home with new digital devices paired with four years of mobile broadband connectivity. This commitment builds on the company's first ConnectED commitment, made in 2014, to connect 50,000 K-12 students nationwide with mobile broadband wireless service.
- Verizon, which announced a multi-year program to support ConnectED through up to $100 million in cash and in-kind commitments"

== Implications ==
The Federal Communications Commission (FCC) has committed to providing funding for the ConnectEd initiative. The government estimated that the cost of this initiative would fall between $4 and $6 billion, which would not be funded by tax dollars. However, this funding may come from a rise in the Universal Service Fund (USF), which the FCC has complete control in determining without congress approval. The USF may be increased on cell phone bills in order to pay for this initiative through the FCC's E-rate program.

The American Enterprise Institute has questioned whether the private company partners in the ConnectEd initiative are taking advantage of additional sales, market shares, or publicity rather than focusing on education policy. Through commitments to funding or providing discounts and/or free devices and software, companies are allowed free advertising as well as push for their products over others. As such, the private interests of these companies may overshadow the public interest of education.

Kathryn Drohman from the University of Washington Tacoma has questioned the sustainability of technology tools in schools since they can quickly become obsolete, can be costly to attain and maintain, can be implemented in a variety of ways by individual teachers.

Austan Goolsbee, Obama's first-term chief economic advisor conducted a study in California which showed that students showed in gains with more computer access. Additionally, a study of ninth graders conducted in 2014 in Portugal found that students who had more internet time had lower learning achievement scores.

The Consortium for School Networking (CoSN) has cited several challenges for school districts in meeting ConnectEd's goals: high costs, growth level capacity, reliability of network service, increased digital needs, infrastructure maintenance, wireless connectivity, and addressing off-campus device needs.
