= Robert Garmston =

Robert J. Garmston is an educator, author, and cognitive theorist. He is Professor Emeritus, School of Education, at California State University, Sacramento. In 2014 he is the director of Facilitation Associates, an educational consulting firm specializing in leadership, learning, and organizational development.

== Early life and education ==
Born out of wedlock in 1933 and adopted at birth, he spent the majority of his childhood in children’s homes and foster families. A high school drop out, he later earned a doctorate degree from the University of Southern California. (Garmston, Robert. I Don't Do That Anymore. Create Space: Charleston, South Carolina, 2011 p 2). Garmston attended California State University, where he graduated with a B.A. in Education in 1959 and an M.A. in Educational Administration in 1963. He earned an Ed.D from the University of Southern California in 1978.

== Career ==
Garmston was a principal in Saudi Arabia, a teacher, a school superintendent, and a curriculum director.

Garmston has been a frequent presenter at International School Conferences. He held a leadership position in the Association for Supervision and Curriculum Development (ASCD). He was an author and speaker with the National Staff Development Council in the field of staff development. He has authored over one hundred publications, some of which have been translated into Arabic, Hebrew, Dutch, French, Italian, and Spanish.

With Dr. Arthur Costa, he is the co-developer of Cognitive Coaching, a program for educators which stresses the importance of self observation and analysis in the process of improving teaching practices. He is also co-founder of the Institute for Intelligent Behavior.

Garmston is also co-author and co-developer of the Adaptive Schools program with Bruce Wellman. Adaptive Schools is an initiative focused on developing collaborative groups within schools which focus on strengthening student achievement. Garmston's book The Adaptive Schools: A Sourcebook for Developing Collaborative Groups (with Bruce Wellman) explains how to organize these groups.

Garmston has written books and articles, and presented workshops and seminars, dealing with educational leadership, the teaching and learning process, and staff development. He is also the author of his memoir entitled I Don't Do That Anymore: A Memoir of Resilience and Awakening.

== Publications ==
- Collaborative Analysis of Student Work (2003)

Costa, A., & Garmston, R. with Ellison, J. & Hayes, C. (2016). Cognitive coaching: Developing self directed leaders and learners. 3rd edition. Lanham MD: Rowman & Littlefield.

Costa, Garmston & Zimmerman (2014). Cognitive capital: Investing in teacher quality. New York: Teachers College Press.

Garmston, R. (2005). The presenter’s fieldbook: A practical guide. Norwood, MA: Rowman & Littlefield

Garmston, R. (2011) I don’t do that anymore: A memoir of awakening and resilience. South Carolina. Create Space

Garmston, R., Lipton, L., & Kaiser, K. (1998). The psychology of supervision. In G. Firth & E. Pajak (Eds.), The handbook of research on school supervision (pp. 242–286). New York: Macmillan.

Garmston, R. & Von Frank, V. (2012). Unlocking group potential to improve schools. Thousand Oaks, CA: Corwin Press.

Garmston, R., & Wellman, B. (1992). How to make presentations that teach and transform. Alexandria VA: Association for Supervision and Curriculum Development.

Garmston, R. (February,1987). How Administrators Support Peer Coaching. Alexandria VA: Association for Supervision and Curriculum Development.

Garmston, R. (1989). Is Peer Coaching Changing Supervisory Relationships?. Sacramento: California State University. ED315 854

Garmston, R., & Wellman, B. (April 1995). Adaptive Schools in a Quantum Universe. Alexandria VA: Association for Supervision and Curriculum Development. Educational Leadership 52(7), 6 - 12.

Garmston, R., & Wellman, B. (April 1998). Teacher Talk That Makes A Difference. Educational Leadership 55(7), 30-34.

Garmston, R., & Wellman, B. (2016). The adaptive school: A sourcebook for developing collaborative groups 3rd Edition. Lanham, MD: Rowman & Littlefield.

Garmston, R. & Zimmerman, D. (2013). Lemons to lemonade: Resolving problems in meetings, workshops and PLC’s. Thousand Oaks, CA. Corwin Press

Garmston, R., Linder, C. and Whitaker, J. (1993, October) Reflections on Cognitive Coaching. Educational Leadership 51(2), 57-61.

Garmston, R. J. (2018) (The Astonishing Power of Storytelling” Leading, Teaching and Transforming in a New Way. Thousand Oaks, CA., Corwin Press

Garmston, R. & Guilford, CT: Mira Via, C.(2021) The Teacher-Facilitator Handbook. Guilford, CT: Mira Via

Garmston, R. (2021) Ted 1938-2019: Poems and Photos. San Francisco. Blurb.com ISBN 978-1-03-459070-5
