= Eduardo Suger =

Guatemalan educator, physicist, and politician

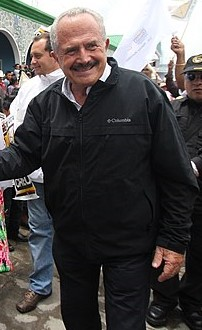
- Suger in Chimaltenango in 2011
- Born: José Eduardo Suger Cofiño; November 29, 1938 (age 87); Zürich, Switzerland
- Citizenship: Guatemala; Switzerland
- Occupations: Physicist, academic
- Known for: Galileo University
- Spouse: Regina Margarita Castillo de Suger
- Children: 5

Academic background
- Education: ETH Zürich; UT Austin

Academic work
- Discipline: Mathematical physicist
- Institutions: Universidad de San Carlos de Guatemala, Galileo University

Eduardo Suger Cofiño (November 29, 1938) is a Swiss-born Guatemalan physicist, scholar, educator, and politician. He is one of the founders of Galileo University in Guatemala City and of the Suger Montano Institute. Suger was the first Central American to receive his PhD in physics.

== Early life ==
Suger was born in Zürich, Switzerland on 29 November 1938 to Emilio Suger, a Swiss national, and Estela Cofiño Valladares of Acatenango, Chimaltenango, Guatemala. When World War II broke out, Suger's father was called up to complete his mandatory military service. Suger's mother spoke no German despite living in Switzerland and traveled to the Guatemalan Consulate in Germany for help returning to Guatemala. Shortly after she and Suger returned, she married Enrique Castañeda Rubio, an engineer and official in the Army, and had four more children. Suger lived with his maternal grandmother nearby from the time his mother remarried until his grandmother died in 1949/1950.

=== Education ===
Suger graduated from La Preparatoria and earned extra money tutoring his classmates in math. He briefly studied chemistry at Universidad de San Carlos de Guatemala (USAC) before deciding to study at the Zürich's Federal Institute of Technology (ETH), the same school his role model Albert Einstein attended. He lived with his strict father and stepmother while earning his BS in physics and mathematics and MS in theoretical physics. At 20, he began teaching geometry and physics, and later worked for a quantum mechanics and molecular physics lab at IBM. Suger served in the military before returning to Guatemala in 1964. He subsequently earned his PhD in molecular physics the University of Texas at Austin (UTA) in 1971. While at UTA, he was inducted into Sigma Xi science society; did labwork in a molecular physics group; and was an academic assistant for a postgraduate Classical Mechanics course.

== Academic career ==
Suger has been teaching mathematical physics for more than 50 years in universities in four different countries. He taught at the Minerva and Freundenberg Institutes in Zürich; UTA as a PhD candidate in Texas; as a visiting professor in the Informatics and Computer Science departments at Alberto Masferrer Salvadorean University and the Technological University of El Salvador; and USAC, Universidad Francisco Marroquín, Universidad del Valle de Guatemala, Universidad Mariano Gálvez, Rafael Landívar University, and his own Galileo University in Guatemala City. During the 17 years he worked at USAC, he was affiliated with the medical sciences, engineering, chemistry, pharmacy, economic science, and architecture departments and established the secondary school teaching program. In 1977, Suger joined the faculty at UFM and taught technology, accounting, and economic science classes. Later that year, he proposed the creation of a computer sciences department, which would allow for more in-depth study of these fields; the program proved so popular that it was quickly converted into the Computer Science and Information Technology Institute (IICC). In 1978, enrollment for the related Systems Engineering, Informatics, and Computer Sciences department opened; in 1982, this too became an institute (FISICC) and Suger was named FISICC's first dean. FISICC eventually became part of Galileo University. He also founded the School of Economics and Business Administration department. He founded and directed the Institute of Open Education (IDEA), which challenges the structure of traditional university learning, in 1994.

In 2000, he established Galileo University, one of the first science-technology universities in Guatemala. It was authorized by the Council of Private Higher Education in Guatemala the same year. In 2019, the university, located on Dr Eduardo Suger Cofiño Street in his honor, boasted 40,000 students. Since its foundation, Suger has served as Galileo University's rector.

=== Military ===
Suger has a long history of working with the military as both an educator and an engineer. He has been commended for his work in increasing military access to university through his Guatemalan Army Program at Galileo University.

During the Guatemalan Civil War, he was approached by Chief of Defense Staff General Marco Antonio Espinoza to engineer a computerized system that would help the government monitor revolutionaries and other dissidents. He was made an honorary colonel for his intelligence work. In 2021, USAC announced they intended to award Suger with a Doctor Honoris Causa, also for his military service. A USAC student organization dedicated to honoring the memory of more than 700 students who were murdered or disappeared during the war pushed back. They claimed that Suger's technological modernization within the military and his tracking system worsened the human rights violations that characterized the war. This sentiment echoes Albedrío magazine, the Pro-Human Rights Action Foundation, and Rafael Landívar University's student newspaper Plaza Pública, who directly suggest he should be held accountable for his indirect influence on the violence. Many publications, such as InSight Crime and El Observador GT, as well as academics like Jennifer Schirmer (Historical Clarification Commission) and Hal Brands (Johns Hopkins), merely refer to the intelligence systems he helped develop rather than directly by name.

== Political career ==
Suger ran for President of Guatemala in 2003 (Authentic Integral Development), 2007 (Social Action Centre), and 2011 (CREO). In 2003, he received 2.23% of the votes; in 2007, 7.45%; and in 2011, he took third place with 16.4% of the vote. He has been criticized for only engaging in politics during campaign season, preferring instead to return to his academic career, and for not aligning himself with a political party unless they approach him to be their presidential candidate.

If elected, one of Suger's main priorities would be to improve Guatemala's education system. He is a critic of the complexity of public higher education and claims it often is what delays institutional changes. He encourages strengthening the "academic-productivity" and believes everyone deserves an equal right to education, even guerrilla soldiers. He planned to eliminate poverty by expanding the middle class and by heavily investing in and empowering those in the war-torn northwestern part of the country. He was also interested in turning Guatemala's centralized governmental structure into a federal republic and strengthening the relationship between his home countries of Guatemala and Switzerland.

== Personal life ==
In 1960, Suger met Regina Margarita Castillo Rodríguez during a visit to Guatemala while on holiday from ETH Zürich. They continued to correspond by mail before he returned in 1964. They married on 11 January 1964 in Guatemala. The couple has five sons: José Eduardo, Carlos Enrique, Emilio Alejandro, Christian Andree, and Jean Paul. Jean Paul (Administrative Vice President), José Eduardo (Dean of FISICC), Christian (Director of Materials Distribution), and Carlos (Director of Operations) all work at Galileo. Regina died on 16 March 2021.

Suger's uncle was businessman José Cofiño Ubico, who cofounded Industrias Licoreras de Guatemala. His wife is descended from the founders of Cervecería Centro Americana.

== Awards and honors ==
Award Body	Award/Honor	Notes	Citation
Sigma Xi	Induction	Scientific research honor society	
Guatemala	National Order Francisco Marroquín	Distinguished educators award	
College of Engineers of Guatemala	Distinguished Engineer		
Guatemalan Business Council	1990s Academic Scientific Leader		
Society of Guatemalan Architects	Honorary member		
Olympic Order	Gold Medal		
Universidad Francisco Marroquín Arts Organization		History-maker in the field of education	
Rose Education Foundation	Rose Award for Education		

== Publications ==
Suger published four editions (1971, 1974, 1978, 1981) of the textbook Introducción a la matemática moderna, which he wrote with Bernardo Morales Figueroa and Leonel Pinot Leiva.

=== Selected academic publications ===
Year	Authors	Title	Publisher	ID	Ref
1967	Suger Cofiño, E.; Morales Figueroa, B.; Pinot Leiva, L.	Apuntes de matemáticas: introducción a la teoría de grupos anillos, dominios enteros, cuerpos, campos, el némero racional			
1973	Matsen, F.A.; Suger, J.E.; Picone, J.M.	Spin-Free Quantum Chemistry. XIII. Spin Waves*	International Journal of Quantum Chemistry	DOI 10.1002/qua.560070604	
1974	Ananthakrishna, G.; Suger, J Eduardo	Phase transition in a class of Hamiltonians	Pramana	DOI 10.1007/BF02875067	
