= Morgan G. Ames =

American science and technology studies researcher

Morgan G. Ames is a scholar of science and technology studies whose work examines technology, education, childhood and inequality. She is an associate professor of practice at the UC Berkeley School of Information at the University of California, Berkeley.

Ames is known for her research on One Laptop per Child (OLPC) and technological utopianism. Her book The Charisma Machine: The Life, Death, and Legacy of One Laptop per Child was published in 2019. It received the Sally Hacker Prize, the ASIS&T Best Information Science Book Award and the Computer History Museum Prize.

== Career ==
Ames published The Charisma Machine: The Life, Death, and Legacy of One Laptop per Child in 2019. The book examines the history of OLPC and the ideas about childhood, learning and technology that shaped the project. W. Patrick McCray reviewed the book in the Los Angeles Review of Books. He discussed Ames's account of the technological optimism surrounding OLPC and its educational ambitions. The book was also reviewed in Comparative Education Review and Technology and Culture.

EdSurge interviewed Ames about this research and her concept of charismatic technology. She used the term for technologies that attract support through ambitious promises of social transformation.

== Awards ==
Ames received the ASIS&T Best Information Science Book Award for The Charisma Machine. Sally Hacker Prize, Society for the History of Technology in 2020.
