= Office of Educational Technology =

Office within the United States Department of Education

- Office of Educational Technology seal

Agency overview
- Formed: 1990; 36 years ago
- Headquarters: Washington, DC, U.S.
- Agency executive: Chris Rush
- Website: tech.ed.gov

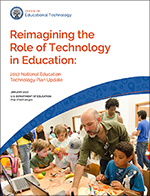
2010 National Educational Technology Plan

The Office of Educational Technology (OET) is part of the Office of Planning, Evaluation and Policy Development in the Office of the Secretary of the United States Department of Education. OET develops national educational technology policy and advocates for the transition from print-based to digital learning and supports the President's and Secretary’s educational priorities.

The Office of Educational Technology was established in 1994 as part of the Goals 2000 Educate America Act. The first director of the Office of Educational Technology was Linda Roberts. The office's staff was laid off in 2025 in response to Executive Order 14202.

== Key Initiatives of OET ==
- Supporting personalized learning models
- ConnectEd_Initiative (connecting US schools to broadband)
- Creating Education Innovation Clusters
- Publishing National Educational Technology Plans in 1996, 2000, 2004, 2010, 2016, 2017, and 2024.

== Notable OET Publications ==
- Artificial Intelligence and the Future of Teaching and Learning
- Enhancing Teaching and Learning through Educational Data Mining and Learning Analytics
- Expanding Evidence Approaches for Learning in a Digital World
- Learning With Connected and Inspired Educators
- Promoting Grit, Tenacity, and Perseverance—Critical Factors for Success in the 21st Century

== Former OET Directors ==
The Office of Education Technology has had seven directors in its duration.

- Linda Roberts (1993–2001)
- John Bailey
- Susan Patrick (2004–?)
- Tim Magner (2006–?)
- Karen Cator (2009–2013)
- Richard Culatta (2013–2015)
- Joseph South
- Chris Rush
