= Alexander Repenning =

American computer programmer

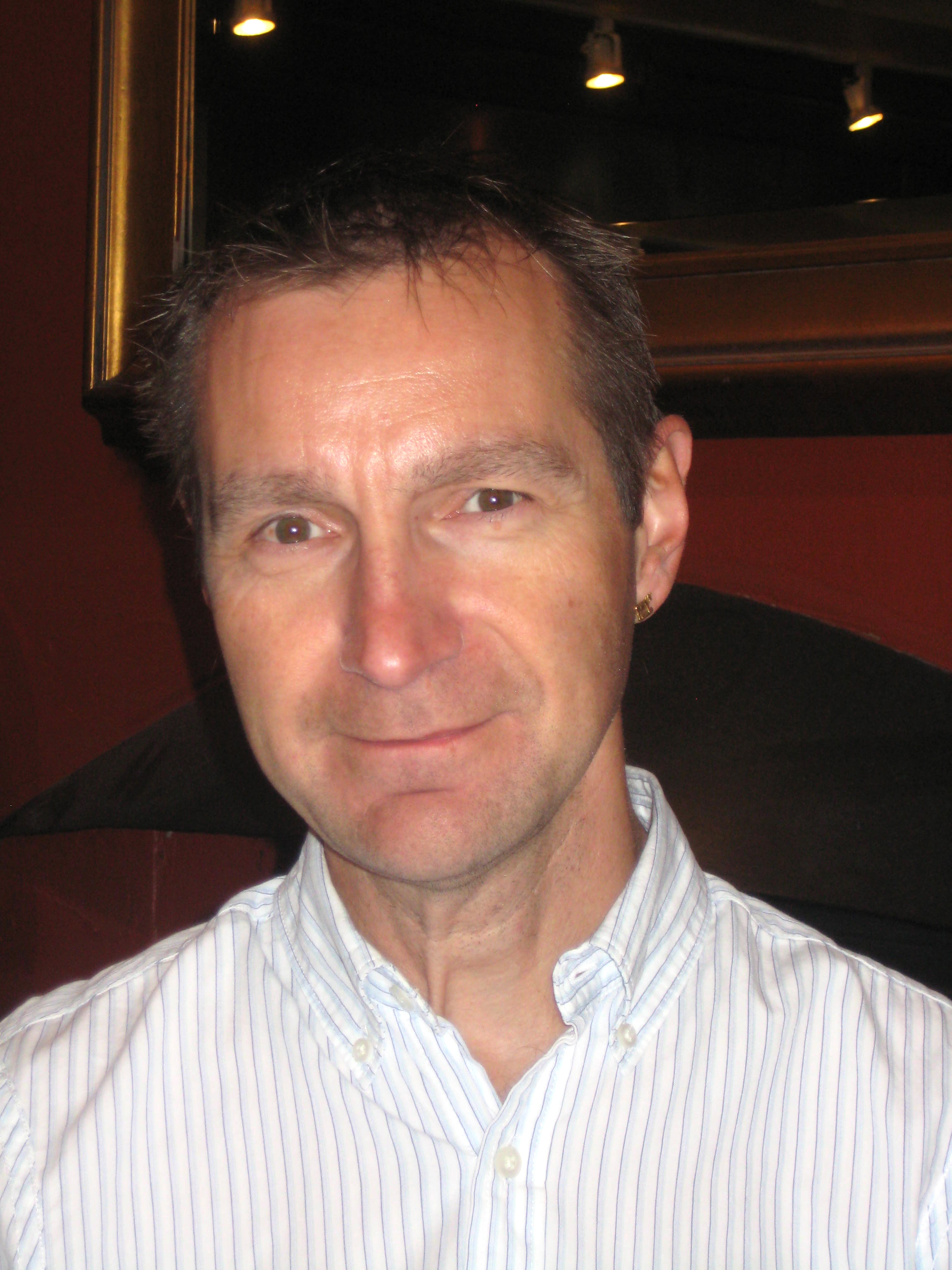
- Born: Baden, Switzerland
- Citizenship: United States, Switzerland
- Education: University of Colorado at Boulder
- Known for: AgentSheets, AgentCubes
- Scientific career
- Fields: Computer Science, Cognitive Science
- Workplaces: University of Colorado at Boulder

Alexander Repenning is the Director of the Scalable Game Design project, a computer science professor adjunct, a founder of AgentSheets Inc., and a member of the Center for Lifelong Learning and Design at the University of Colorado in Boulder. His research interests include computer science education, end-user programmable agents, human-computer interaction, and artificial intelligence.

== Contributions ==
Repenning is the creator of the AgentSheets and AgentCubes Cyberlearning tools used for game design and computational science applications. As the Director of the Scalable Game Design project, using AgentSheets, he leads an effort to reinvent computer science education in public schools through game design starting at the middle school level. With over 10,000 students, and with funding from the National Science Foundation (ITEST and CE21 programs) and Google, the Scalable Game Design project is conducting the largest US study of computer science education at the middle school level including inner city schools, remote rural areas, and Native American communities. Results indicate that students, across genders and ethnicities, are not only highly motivated to learn computer science through game design but they also learn essential computational thinking skills. They acquire skills through game design, which later they can leverage in STEM simulation creation. Repenning's theoretical contributions include a pedagogical framework called the Zones of Proximal Flow combining Vygotsky’s Zone of Proximal Development with Csikszentmihalyi’s state of Flow.
