= AgentSheets =

Block-based programming language

- AgentSheets tool
- Paradigm: object-oriented
- Designed by: Alexander Repenning
- First appeared: 1991; 35 years ago
- Stable release: 4.0 / May 19, 2014; 12 years ago
- Platform: JVM
- License: proprietary
- Website: www.agentsheets.com

Influenced by
- Lisp, Logo, Smalltalk

Influenced
- Etoys, Scratch

AgentSheets is a block-based programming language designed for children. AgentSheets uses drag-and-drop mechanisms with commands such as conditions and actions as editable blocks that could be composed into programs.

The main building blocks of AgentSheets were interactive objects, or "agents", that were programmed through rules. Using conditions, agents could sense the user input, including speech recognition and webpage content. Using actions, agents could move, produce sounds, open webpages, and compute formulas.

== History ==
The first prototype of AgentSheets ran in 1989 at the University of Colorado, NCAR, and Connection Machine 2. In 1991, behavior such as a train following train tracks can be specified through before/after rules. These rules are programming by example.

In 1996, with the support of the National Science Foundation, AgentSheets became a commercial product. More interaction modalities have been added (e.g., speech recognition for Mac), scientific visualization has been refined (e.g., 3D real-time plotting on Mac versions), and Japanese and Greek translations have been added. In 2010, AgentSheets 3 was released.

AgentSheets was supported by Scalable Game Design aligned with the International Society for Technology in Education's National Educational Technology Standards (NETS). The NSF ITEST program has in some schools over 900 students participating per year, per school. Over 52% of whom were girls. Of the girls, 85% enjoyed the scalable game design course, and 78% would like to take another game design course.

== Design ==
The built-in drag-and-drop language was designed for students. Similar to a spreadsheet, an AgentSheet was a computational grid. This grid contains numbers and strings (much like a normal spreadsheet) as well as "agents", or interactive objects programmed through rules. These agents are represented by pictures, can be animated, react to mouse/keyboard interactions, can read webpages, and can speak and recognize speech commands on Mac versions.

== See also ==
- Web-based simulation (WBS)
- Scratch (another block-based programming language)
