= Alliance for Excellent Education =

Nonprofit organization in Washington D.C., United States

The Alliance for Excellent Education ("All4ed" or "The Alliance") is a Washington, DC–based national policy and advocacy organization dedicated to ensuring that all students, particularly those who are traditionally underserved, graduate from high school ready for success in college, work, and citizenship.

The Alliance focuses on America’s six million most at-risk secondary school students—those in the lowest achievement quartile—who are most likely to leave school without a diploma or to graduate unprepared for a productive future. To do this, the Alliance advocates at the federal level for funding and policies to ensure resources are targeted to at-risk students in middle school and high school.

== History ==
The Alliance was founded by Gerard and Lilo Leeds. Mr. and Mrs. Leeds had retired from CMP Media, Inc., the technology publishing company they launched in 1971. When, in 1988, the Leeds turned the management of their company over to two of their sons, they turned their attention to philanthropy and in 1990 the couple launched the Institute for Student Achievement (ISA), which works in partnership with low-performing school districts to help at-risk middle- and high-school students.

Hoping to build on the success of ISA and implement it nationally, Mr. and Mrs. Leeds founded the Alliance in December 1999 and hired Susan Frost as the first President in 2001. Frost had served for six years as advisor to U.S. Secretary of Education Richard Riley and for 11 years as executive director of the Committee for Education Funding (CEF). As President of the Alliance, Frost helped identify the weaknesses in President George W. Bush’s No Child Left Behind Act and recognized key strategies for policymakers to help schools raise student achievement and graduation rates. The Alliance called on national policymakers to expand the federal role in education to high school students with initiatives in adolescent literacy, teacher and principal quality, college preparation planning, and smaller, more personalized learning communities. Legislation that embodied these recommendations was then introduced in the U.S. House of Representatives (the Graduation for All Act) and the Senate (the PASS Act).

On August 3, 2004 Frost resigned as President of the Alliance. In February 2005 former West Virginia Governor Bob Wise was hired as the Alliance's second President. Under his leadership, the Alliance increased in size and expanded its policies to include work in states. Today, the Alliance focuses on several issues critical to high school reform, including adolescent literacy, the Common Core State Standards, Deeper Learning, and digital learning.

On February 1, 2012, the Alliance held the inaugural Digital Learning Day.

AEE was among the charities that invested with Bernard Madoff.
