= David O. McKay School of Education =

Coordinates: 40°14′50″N 111°39′07″W

The David O. McKay School of Education (SOE) at Brigham Young University (BYU) specializes in teaching, administration, communication disorders, and educational inquiry. It is located in three buildings on BYU's campus in Provo, Utah, the David O. McKay Building, the John Taylor Building, and the George Albert Smith Fieldhouse. It was ranked number 84 in the United States for best education schools for 2021.

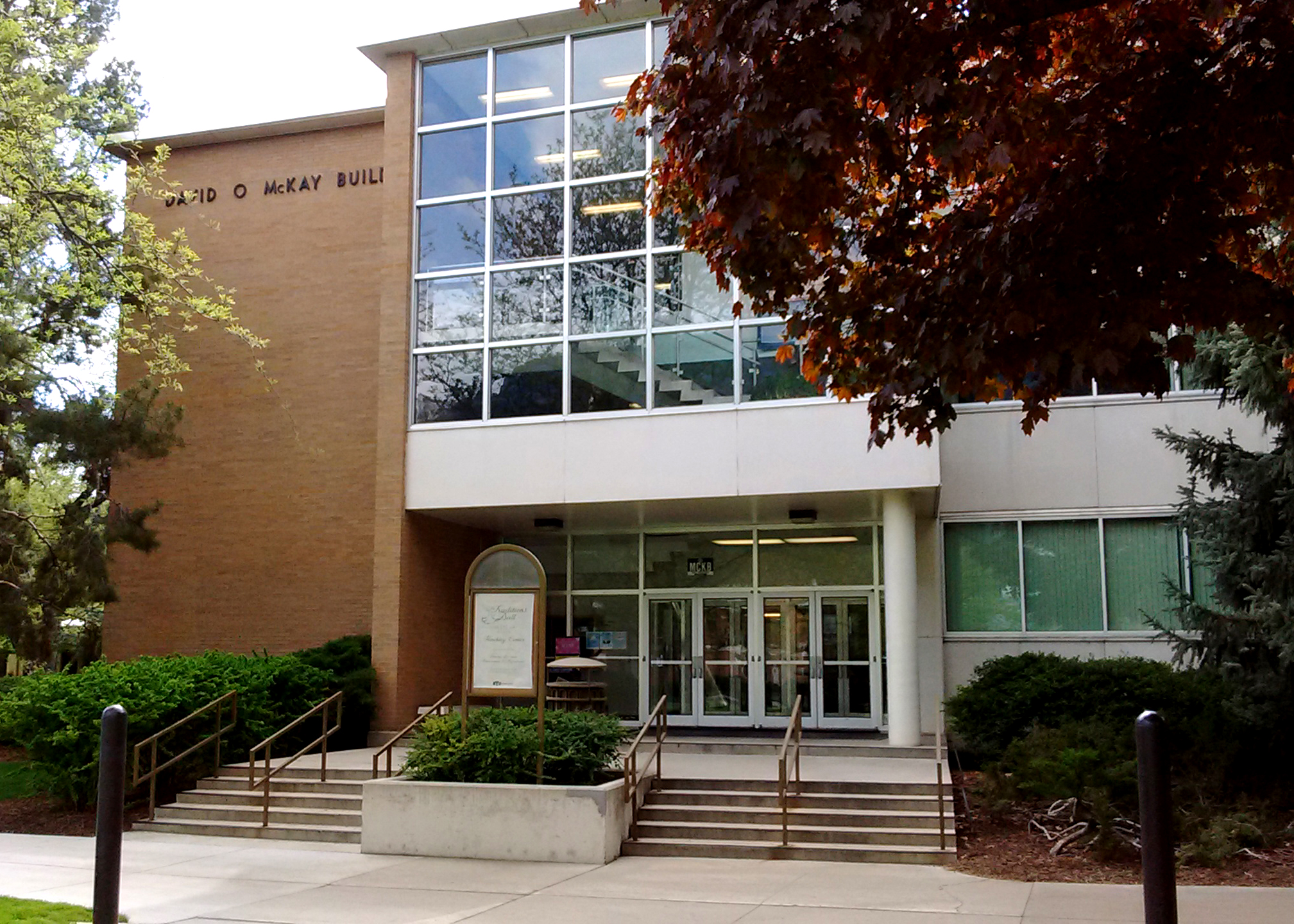
The southeast end of the David O. McKay Building.

== History ==
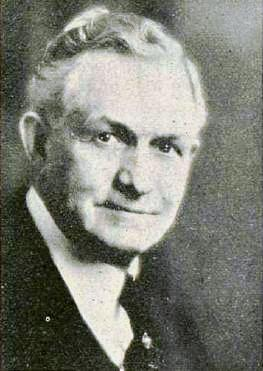
David O. McKay, the educator and LDS church president that the McKay School is named after.

The SOE began in 1913 as the Church Teachers College. It has gone through several subsequent name changes: the School of Education (1920), the College of Education (1921), prior to receiving its current name (1998). It was named after David O. McKay, an educator and former president of the Church of Jesus Christ of Latter-day Saints (LDS Church).

In 1954, the undergraduate majors outside of elementary education and early childhood education were shifted into the colleges of their specific disciplines. Since then, the SOE has only offered educational methods courses for education majors housed in different colleges. In 2010, the Physical Education Teacher Education major was moved back to the SOE with the dissolution of the Physical Education, Health, and Recreation department.

== Dean ==
Sarah Clark is serving as the college’s dean, following former dean Kendra Hall-Kenyon appointment as an associate academic vice president. Since July 2023, Clark has worked as an associate dean in the McKay School. She has also served as department chair and a professor in the Department of Teacher Education.

== Educator Preparation Program (EPP) ==
The EPP, one of the largest in the nation, coordinates teacher education courses and training for all education degrees at BYU. It coordinates 26 undergraduate degrees, 21 minors, and 4 graduate degrees. These degrees are housed in their respective colleges, but education training is offered through the SOE.

EPP offers secondary education degrees in the areas of world languages, STEM, arts, social sciences, and physical health.

== BYU–Public School Partnership ==
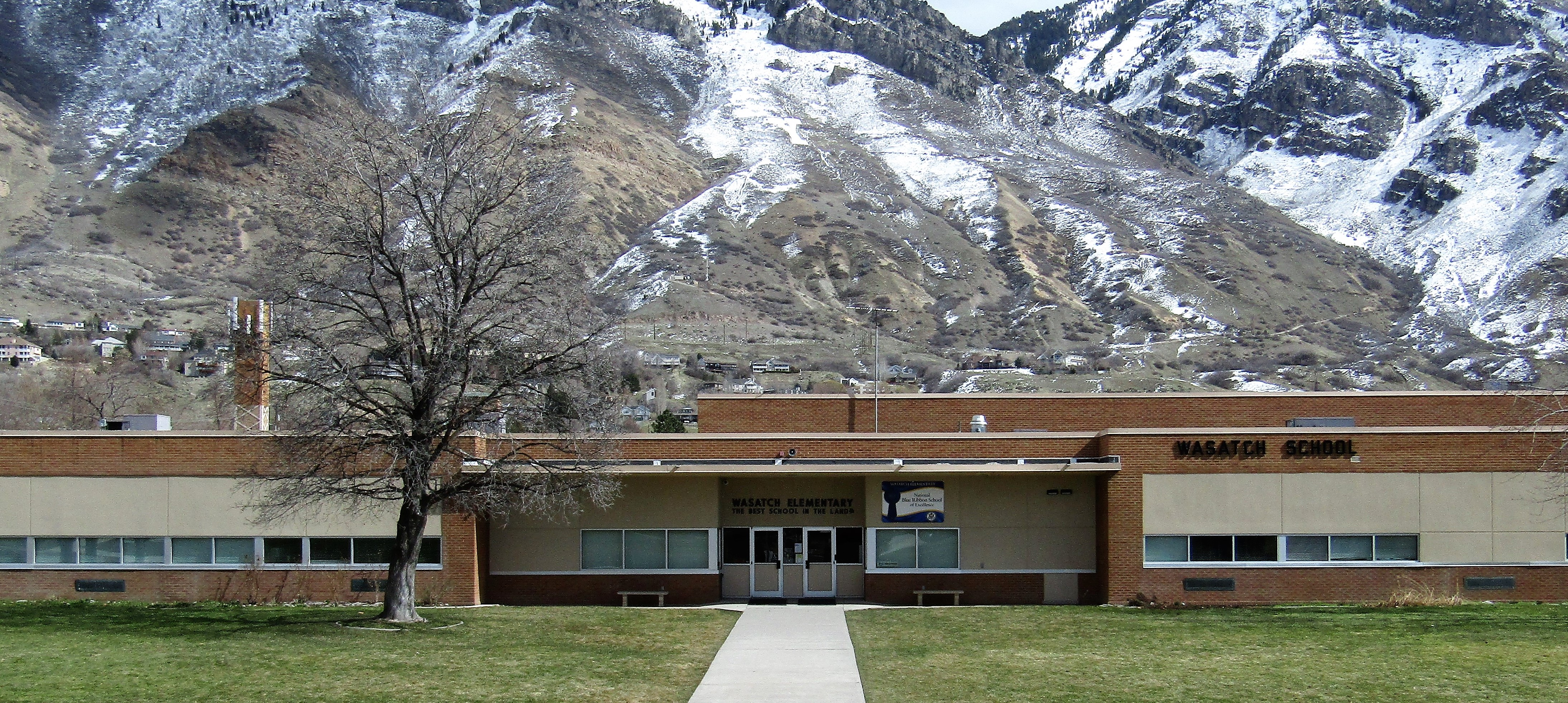
Wasatch Elementary School, across the street from BYU, is in the Provo City School District and part of the BYU–Public School Partnership.

Since 1984, the Public School Partnership has facilitated collaboration between (1) the SOE, (2) five Utah school districts (Alpine, Jordan, Nebo, Provo, and Wasatch), and (3) the arts and sciences colleges and departments at BYU that participate in preparing K–12 educators.

This partnership is unique in its size, scope, and longevity. The schools within the partnership are composed of more than 7,000 teachers and approximately 180,000 students. BYU and the SOE graduate approximately 800 certified teachers each year, many of whom receive student teacher training at those schools.

== Notable alumni ==
Alumni in education include instructional design researcher Charles Reigeluth, weatherman and middle school teacher Clayton Brough, President of Snow College and BYU–Hawaii J. Elliot Cameron, CEO of ISTE Richard Culatta, President of Western Michigan University John Dunn, and President of what now is Utah Valley University Wilson W. Sorensen.

Notable alumni include LDS Church leaders such as Bonnie H. Cordon, Young Women general president from 2018 to 2023, Michelle D. Craig, a counselor in the Young Women general presidency from 2018 to 2023, J. Annette Dennis, a counselor in the Relief Society general presidency since 2022, Ardeth G. Kapp, a former Young Women General President, Bradley R. Wilcox, a counselor in the Young Men general presidency since 2020, Jay E. Jensen and Rex D. Pinegar, both general authorities who served in the Presidency of the Seventy, Julie B. Beck, a former Relief Society General President, Mary N. Cook, a former counselor in the Young Women general presidency, and Russell T. Osguthorpe, a former Sunday School General President.

Alumni in politics include politician Kristen Cox, Senator Marian Bergeson, and Utah Governor Olene Walker.

== Degrees offered ==
The information in this table comes from the school's website.

Minors	
Minor	Teaching English Language Learners (TELL) (preparation for TESOL Endorsement)
Minor	Design Thinking
Bachelor's Degrees	
BS	Communication Disorders
BS	Early Childhood Education (preparation for K–3 Licensure)
BS	Elementary Education (preparation for K–6 Licensure)
BS	Physical Education Teacher Education (preparation for K-12 Licensure)
BS	Special Education
Master's Degrees	
MA	Teacher Education
Med	Educational Leadership
MS	Instructional Psychology and Technology
MS	Communication Disorders
MS	Special Education
Doctoral Degrees	
PhD	Counseling Psychology
PhD	Educational Inquiry, Measurement and Evaluation
PhD	Instructional Psychology and Technology
EdD	Educational Leadership
EdS	School Psychology

== Notes ==
=== External links ===
- Brigham Young University
