= Eric Klopfer =

- Born: October 8, 1970 (age 55)
- Education: Cornell University, University of Wisconsin, Madison
- Scientific career
- Fields: Teacher preparation, educational technology, games and simulations
- Workplaces: Massachusetts Institute of Technology

Eric Klopfer (born October 8, 1970) is a professor and director of the Scheller Teacher Education Program and the education arcade at MIT. Klopfer's research explores how educational technology, games, and computer simulations can be tools for teaching complex systems and developing cognitive and computational thinking skills. Klopfer and his research group developed StarLogo and variations, including StarLogo Nova. He was also involved with the early development and use of App Inventor for Android and other visual programming language platforms that build on the work of Seymour Papert and constructionism in education. He is also the principal investigator in the research and development of award-winning games designed for building understanding in science and math, connecting game play with scientific practice, problem-solving, and real-world issues.

In 2014, Klopfer produced a series of four online courses on the edX learning platform, delivering videos, tools, and assignments for participants to create, implement, and evaluate projects in educational technology. Klopfer is co-founder and past president of the non-profit Learning Games Network, co-author of Adventures in Modeling and The More We Know, and the author of Augmented Learning. He has published highly cited work on educational games, location based games, the integration of computer science and science learning, and AI education

He is an elected fellow of the American Association for the Advancement of Science In 2021 he co-founded MIT's RAISE (Responsible AI for Social Empowerment and Education) initiative, which promotes ethical and responsible education about and with AI His work continues to engage with the rapidly evolving topic of AI and Education

He is the husband of Rachel Klopfer, and the father of two children.
