= Association for Supervision and Curriculum Development =

American membership organization for education professionals

ASCD
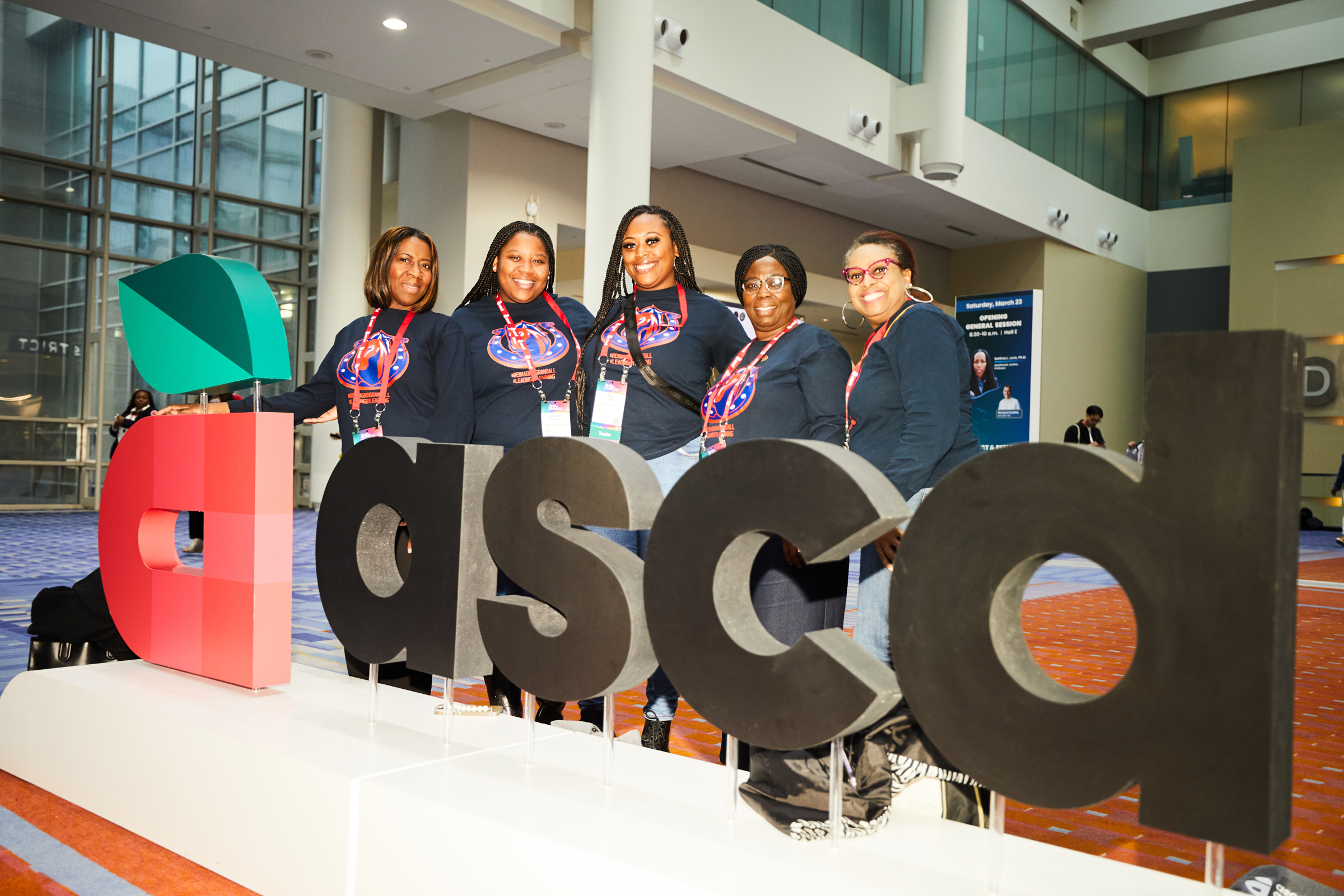
- Educators participating in the ASCD Annual Conference 2024 in Washington DC
- Formation: 1943
- Legal status: Non-profit organization
- Purpose: Education
- Headquarters: Arlington, VA
- Members: 125,000 members in 128 countries.

ASCD, formerly known as the Association for Supervision and Curriculum Development, is an education non-profit organization founded in 1943. It has more than 125,000 members from more than 128 countries, including superintendents, principals, teachers, professors of education, and other educators. The ASCD community also includes affiliate organizations Student Chapters.

While ASCD was initially founded with a focus on curriculum and supervision, the organization now provides professional development, publishing, and event experiences focusing on a broad range of topics for educators.

== History and governance ==
ASCD formed when the National Education Association's Society for Curriculum Study and Department of Supervisors and Directors of Instruction merged in 1943. ASCD became totally independent of the NEA in 1972.

In 2023 ASCD merged with ISTE to form the largest education non-profit organization focused on supporting educators in designing high-quality learning experiences for all students. The merger brings together the instructional expertise of ASCD with the innovation expertise of ISTE. The merged organization is led by Richard Culatta, who previously served as the Chief Innovation Officer for the State of Rhode Island and Executive Director at the US Department of Education.

ISTE+ASCD is governed by a Board of Directors, which includes the CEO.

== Educational Leadership ==
Educational Leadership (EL) magazine is ASCD's flagship publication, with a circulation of 135,000. EL provides information about teaching and learning, new ideas and practices relevant to practicing educators, and the latest trends and issues affecting prekindergarten through higher education. EL is published eight times each year, September through May, with a combined issue in December/January.

== Key Initiatives ==
In March 2007, ASCD launched its Whole Child Initiative to ensure all children are healthy, safe, engaged in learning, supported by caring adults, and academically challenged. The public-engagement and advocacy campaign encourages schools and communities to work together so that each student has access to a challenging curriculum in a healthy and supportive environment. ASCD contends that "current educational practice and policy focus overwhelmingly on academic achievement. This achievement, however, is but one element of student learning and development and only a part of any complete system of educational accountability." Partner organizations, such as the American School Health Association, Developmental Studies Center, and the National School Boards Association, have signed on in support of the initiative. Other key initiatives include Differentiated instruction, Understanding by Design, and What Works in Schools.

== Programs, products, and services ==
ASCD offers four main services; events, publishing, professional learning, and membership. In 2024 ASCD announced that its flagship Annual Conference would be co-located with the ISTE annual conference (ISTELive) beginning in San Antonio in 2025. In 2026 the co-located ISTELive and ASCD Annual Conference will be held in Orlando Florida from June 28th to July 1st 2026.
