= Eric Schaps =

Eric Schaps (born September 16, 1942, died October 21, 2021) is an education researcher and founder of the Developmental Studies Center (DSC), a nonprofit educational R&D organization located in Oakland CA for most of its history. He established the nonprofit in 1980 and served as its president until his retirement in 2011. The organization subsequently changed its name to the Center for the Collaborative Classroom and relocated to Alameda CA. On October 21, 2021, Eric died after an extended battle with of cancer.

== Biography ==
Schaps founded the Developmental Studies Center to create programs that enable educators to simultaneously foster students' academic, social, and ethical growth. Previously he founded two other non-profit organizations: Alternative Inc. in Chicago IL and the Pacific Institute for Research and Evaluation in San Francisco CA. From 2010 to 2019 he also served as Executive Consultant for the Collaborative for Academic, Social and Emotional Learning (CASEL) located in Chicago IL. He is the author of three books and 75 book chapters and articles on education, program evaluation, and prevention of problem behaviors.

Schaps was principal investigator on $85,000,000 of grants from public and philanthropic sources. His honors include the Science to Practice Award from the Society for Prevention Research, the Sandy Award for Lifetime Achievement in Character Education from the Character Education Partnership, and an honorary doctorate from the University of Missouri.

He was a contributing author for Educating for Humanity: Rethinking the Purposes of Education. He was a participant in the CHARACTER COUNTS! Aspen Summit Conference. He was a researcher on Getting Results: Developing Safe and Healthy Kids, Update 5: Student Health, Supportive Schools, and Academic Success. He was featured on the Maryland Center for Character Education, Monthly Featured Best Practices for his "Eleven Principals of Effective Character Education" with Tom Lickona and Catherine Lewis.

== Personal ==
Schaps received his PhD in social psychology from Northwestern University where he also did his undergraduate work.
