= Technological pedagogical content knowledge =

Educational technology knowledge

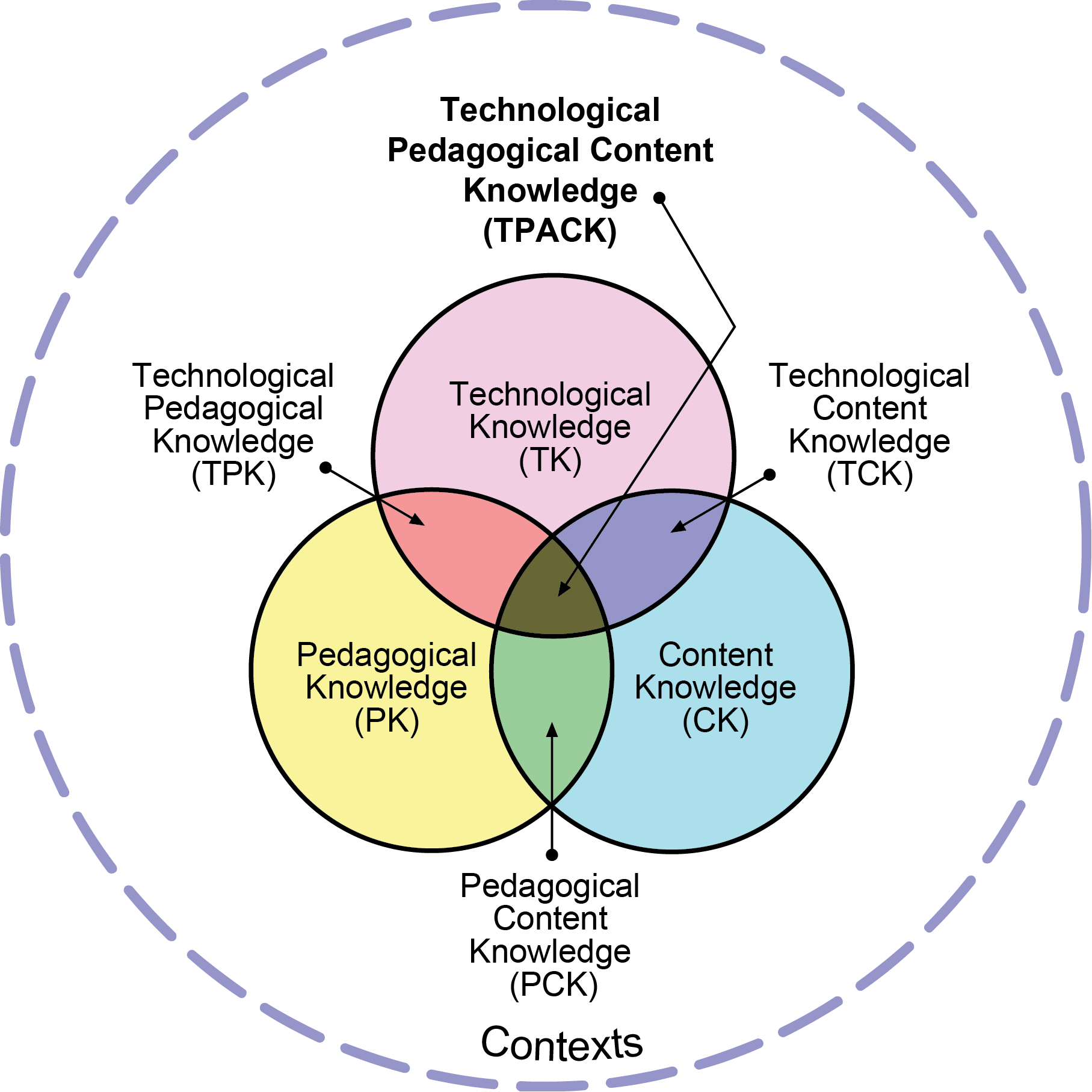
Visual representation of the Technological, Pedagogical, and Content Knowledge framework

The Technological Pedagogical Content Knowledge (TPACK) framework is an educational model that describes the intersections between technology, pedagogy, and content for the effective integration of technology into teaching. TPACK became popular in the early 2000s.

TPACK divides a teacher's contextual knowledge (XK) in teaching into three broad categories: content knowledge (CK), pedagogical knowledge (PK), and technological knowledge (TK). At the intersection of two categories are more specific forms of knowledge: pedagogical content knowledge (PCK), technological content knowledge (TCK), technological pedagogical knowledge (TPK). At the intersection of all three categories is technological pedagogical content knowledge (TPACK). Contextual knowledge also includes information apart from the three categories, such as an awareness of school policies.

Researchers argue that effective technological integration involves an understanding of the relationships between all three forms of knowledge in a teaching context.

== History ==
In the early 2000s, scholars noted a lack of theory and conceptual frameworks to inform and guide research and teacher preparation in technology integration. The classic definition of PCK proposed by Shulman included one dynamic and complex relationship between two different knowledge bodies: content knowledge and pedagogical knowledge. Shulman defined PCK as the blend between content and pedagogy, highlighting the teacher's comprehension of how topics should be taught according to students' diverse interests and capabilities.

For five years, Mishra & Koehler conducted an experiment to understand educators’ development of rich technology uses as well as helping them develop their teaching with technology. As a result of this work, they arrived at the Technological, Pedagogical, Content Knowledge (TPCK) model in 2008, later renamed to TPACK. The questions of "what the teachers need to know in order to appropriately incorporate technology into their teaching... and how they might develop it" were key to the framework development. In 2019, Mishra proposed an additional aspect of teacher knowledge, contextual knowledge (XK), which encompasses knowledge of not only the TPACK forms but also organisational and situational constraints, such as school policies and available technologies.

Educators found they needed new skills as new technologies entered the field. Consequently, technology knowledge became an essential feature of teacher knowledge. Scholars proposed different frames about TPACK to promote a particular view, including ways and diverse perspectives on understanding and working with technology in the classroom. TPACK-based research has led to the emergence of a significant literature body.

As Herring and colleagues described, the historical development of TPACK provided a conceptualization that both graphically and narratively explained what is studied, and presented the key concepts, factors, or variables and the presumed relationships found between them. Additionally, it scaffolds the application of findings to other contexts that theoreticians, researchers, and practitioners continue to examine.

== Definition ==
TPACK domains and related subdomains address the complex nature of teaching effectively with appropriate technologies. While the different domains and subdomains can be explored as separate skill concepts, domains and subdomains were conceptualized to work in synergistic reciprocity meaning that the knowledge is not entirely separate indicating the intersectionality of each area. Accordingly, the TPACK model consists of three main domains, each containing one subdomain. The purpose of the subdomains is to unpack the broader domain concept by understanding intersections among the three primary knowledge anchors for the overall framework. The main domains are 1. Technological Content Knowledge (TCK); 2. Pedagogical Content Knowledge (PCK), and 3. Technological Pedagogical Knowledge (TPK). The three subdomains are 1. Technological Knowledge (TK); 2. Content Knowledge (CK); and 3. Pedagogical Knowledge (PK). In 2019, Mishra proposed a revised TPACK diagram to emphasize the context in which technology integration occurs by retitling the outer circle as Contextual Knowledge or XK.

Technological Knowledge (TK) addresses how teachers demonstrate professional knowledge of technology. TK considers what is required for teachers to integrate technology tools and resources into their course content and instructional practice. The technology component of TPaCK is most beneficial for learning when it brings a change in professional teaching practice and in designs for learning. For teachers, TK not only addresses knowledge about technology but also knowledge of the skills needed to use technology to effectively plan instruction, including with science teachers. TK involves understanding cross-platform applications and capabilities as well as how to configure those applications to realize instructional objectives and student learning outcomes.

Content Knowledge (CK) is situated within the following definitional parameters of a teacher's knowledge about a particular subject matter and how it is taught and learned. As Shulman noted, CK would include knowledge of concepts, theories, ideas, organizational frameworks, knowledge of evidence and proof, as well as established practices and approaches toward developing such knowledge." For educators, effective content instruction that engages students in higher-order activities using authentic, real-world examples facilitated through technology is the cornerstone of teaching and learning in the 21st century. Thus, educators must not only be thoughtful in the instructional techniques they use to present content but also strategic in the technology selected to teach the subject matter as it may result in positive or negative results in long-term learning and knowledge retention.

Pedagogical Knowledge (PK) addresses how teachers demonstrate professional knowledge of pedagogy. PK refers to the specific knowledge about teaching such as approaches or methods of how teachers teach a particular topic or how to scaffold a concept to the diverse interests and abilities of learners. For teachers and educators, an effective teaching method that engages students in higher-order activities using real-world examples facilitated through different learning styles is the cornerstone of teaching and learning in the current era. Accordingly, educators must be thoughtful in the instructional techniques to teach the subject matter as it may have a great impact on long-term learning and knowledge acquisition. Choosing the right technology to enable higher-order thinking within the content, long-term knowledge retention, and facilitate student learning outcomes are paramount within the CK construct. Finally, Context Knowledge (XK) is the umbrella domain that refers to how teachers contextualize implementation based on the overall teaching and learning context.

== Strategies for building TPACK ==
A wide variety of strategies have been used to develop educators’ TPACK abilities, such as (a) collaborative, design-based lesson planning; (b) the use of technology mapping, game-based learning, and deep-play (c) scaffolding the design process; and (d) accounting for how teacher's beliefs influence their TPACK. Researchers have found collaborative strategies to be helpful to develop teachers’ TPACK, such as (a) faculty-wide mentoring programs, (b) professional collaboration and teacher talk, (c) collaborative reflection practices, and (d) professional learning communities. Teacher education leaders have used the Theory of Action to identify the critical areas as they plan for the effective integration of TPACK into their teacher education and faculty support programs. Moreover, several traditional faculty development approaches have been found useful for helping teachers develop PCK, including instructional consultations, workshops and seminars, online modules.

== Measures ==
Since its introduction, researchers and professional developers have created a variety of processes and instruments to assess an educator's TPACK, such as self-report measures, open-ended questionnaires, performance assessments, interviews, observations, and more. Widely-used measures such as the Survey of Preservice Teachers’ Knowledge of Teaching and Technology, the TPACK-21 questionnaire, and the TPACK leadership diagnostic tool, have been tested for reliability and validity and applied in a variety of educational settings.

Researchers have made considerable efforts to explore the details of educators’ TPACK through both quantitative and qualitative measures. Qualitative approaches for evaluating TPACK have included classroom observations, the analysis of lesson plans, classroom videos, and interviews. Furthermore, as researchers have sought to better address how the components of XK (including online learning environments and global contexts) influence the development of TPACK, measures of TPACK have begun to include educators’ future intentions to use technology. Additionally, researchers have also considered educators’ self-efficacy alongside TPACK.

== Criticisms ==
The TPACK framework has received a number of criticisms, the majority of which are related to the lack of a precise definition. Similar to Shulman's Pedagogical Content Knowledge (PCK), which serves as a foundation for TPACK, scholars have debated whether TPACK is integrative or transformative leading to varied and nuanced perspectives. Furthermore, scholars have debated precise definitions for the seven knowledge domains associated with the TPACK framework, and what differentiates one domain from another varies widely across studies. These challenges have led to what has been called "fuzzy boundaries" distinguishing TPACK domains that have resulted in even more variations or adaptations of TPACK including TPACK-W for web technologies, G-TPACK for geospatial, TPACK-CT for computational thinking, TPACK-P for TPACK practical, etc. These variations have been considered by some researchers to be misappropriations or conceptual dilution.

A second major area of criticism of TPACK is the lack of reliable assessment instruments, as well as difficulties with existing instruments. Some researchers have cited problems related to participant interpretation of survey items, while others have reported problems with convergence when multiple measures are used.

A third major area of criticism is related to the implications of TPACK for practice. Some scholars argue that the complexity of the framework makes it difficult to operationalize among both researchers and practitioners. Further, as a framework for teacher knowledge, it is not accompanied by specific recommendations or strategies for how to help develop this body of knowledge for teachers. Finally, scholars have noted that is unclear whether the TPACK framework promotes the type of reform-oriented teaching encouraged in new standards and curricula.

== See also ==
- Pedagogical Content Knowledge
