= David Moursund =

American computer scientist (1936–2021)

David Garvin Moursund (November 3, 1936 – September 1, 2021) was an American mathematician, computer scientist, author and educator. From 2002 until his death, he was a Professor Emeritus in the College of Education at the University of Oregon. He wrote and taught extensively in the areas of computers, mathematics, and brain science in education.

== Early life and education ==
Moursund attended Condon Elementary School, Roosevelt Junior High School and Eugene High School in Eugene, Oregon, graduating in 1954. He earned a B.A. (Mathematics; minor in Physics) at the University of Oregon in 1958 and completed an M.S. in mathematics at the University of Wisconsin-Madison in 1960. Moursund completed his doctorate in mathematics, specializing in numerical analysis, (January, 1963) at the University of Wisconsin-Madison.

== Academic career ==
Moursund worked as an instructor in the Department of Mathematics, University of Wisconsin-Madison, between January and June 1963, and then was an assistant professor, and later Associate Professor (1966-1967), in the Department of Mathematics and in the College of Engineering (Computer Center) at Michigan State University. He then moved to the University of Oregon as an associate professor, for two years in the Department of Mathematics and then as the first head of the Department of Computer Science (1969-1976). From 1976 until his retirement in 2002, he held the position of full professor, first in Computer and Information Science, and later in the Department of Education.

During his career, Moursund has been a major or co-major supervising professor of six doctoral students in mathematics and 76 doctoral students in education. In 1971 Moursund and Keith Acheson, a faculty member in the University of Oregon's College of Education, established a College of Education doctoral program in the field of Computers in Education.

== Associations and publications ==
In 1974, while teaching at the University of Oregon, Moursund established The Oregon Computing Teacher publication, the publication for the Oregon Council for Computer Education. The publication was renamed The Computing Teacher when it became the main publication of the newly established International Council for Computers in Education (ICCE) which he founded in 1979. Moursund was editor-in-chief and chief executive officer of this organization, 1979–1989.

In 1989, ICCE changed its name to International Society for Technology in Education (ISTE), and in 1990 The Computing Teacher was renamed Learning and Leading with Technology. Moursund led ICCE/ISTE and served as editor-in-chief of its publications for its first 19 years, retiring in 2001.

In 2007, Moursund established an Oregon non-profit company, Information Age Education. It provides free educational material designed for preservice and in-service K-12 teachers of teachers, and parents of K-12 students. Its publications include the IAE Blog, IAE Books, IAE-pedia, and IAE-Newsletter. All of these materials are available free online.

Moursund served as the CEO of the 501(C)(3) non-profit corporation Advancement of Globally Appropriate Technology and Education (AGATE, established in 2015). Information Age Education is wholly contained in AGATE.

== Personal life ==
Moursund died on September 1, 2021, at his home in Florence, Oregon. He is survived by his four children, Beth, Andy, Russell and Jenny; his four step-children, Bethanne, David, Bonnie, and Scott; by his former wife Janet Moursund; and his life partner Ann Lathrop.

== Books ==
Moursund was the author, co-author, editor, or co-editor of more than 70 books, about 45 of which are now free online. His early books were textbooks in areas such as Numerical Analysis, computer programming, calculators, and computer literacy. Most of his more recent books were written for use in preservice and inservice teacher education.

Here is a list of the most popular online books:

The Fourth R (Second Edition) (2018). The 4th R of Reasoning/computational thinking makes use of both human and computer brains to answer questions, represent and solve problems, and accomplish tasks. The book presents arguments for and "how-to" suggestions for fully integrating the 4th R into the entire PreK-12 curriculum. La Cuarta R is the Spanish version.

Brain Science for Educators and Parents (2015). There are brief introductions to a wide range of topics relevant to K-12 teachers and their students, teachers of preservice and in-service teachers, and parents. Includes an annotated list of about 50 related videos.

Learning Problem-solving Strategies Through the Use of Games: A Guide for Teachers and Parents (2016). The book includes a number of activities for preservice and in-service teachers, and a number of activities to use with K-12 students.
