= ISTE Standards =

Standards for the use of technology in teaching and learning

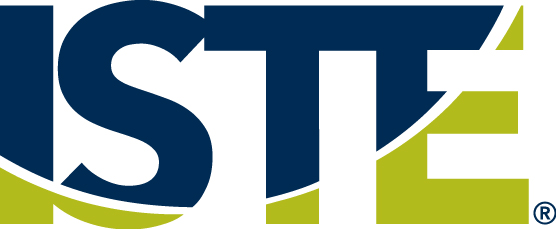
- Abbreviation: ISTE
- Formation: 1979; 47 years ago
- Founder: David Moursund and a group of K-12 and University of Oregon educators
- Type: 501(c)(3) non-profit
- Purpose: Education, Membership organization
- Headquarters: Washington, DC, United States
- Region served: Worldwide
- Key people: Rand Hansen, president Richard Culatta, CEO
- Staff: 75
- Website: iste.org
- Formerly called: The International Council for Computers in Education (ICCE)

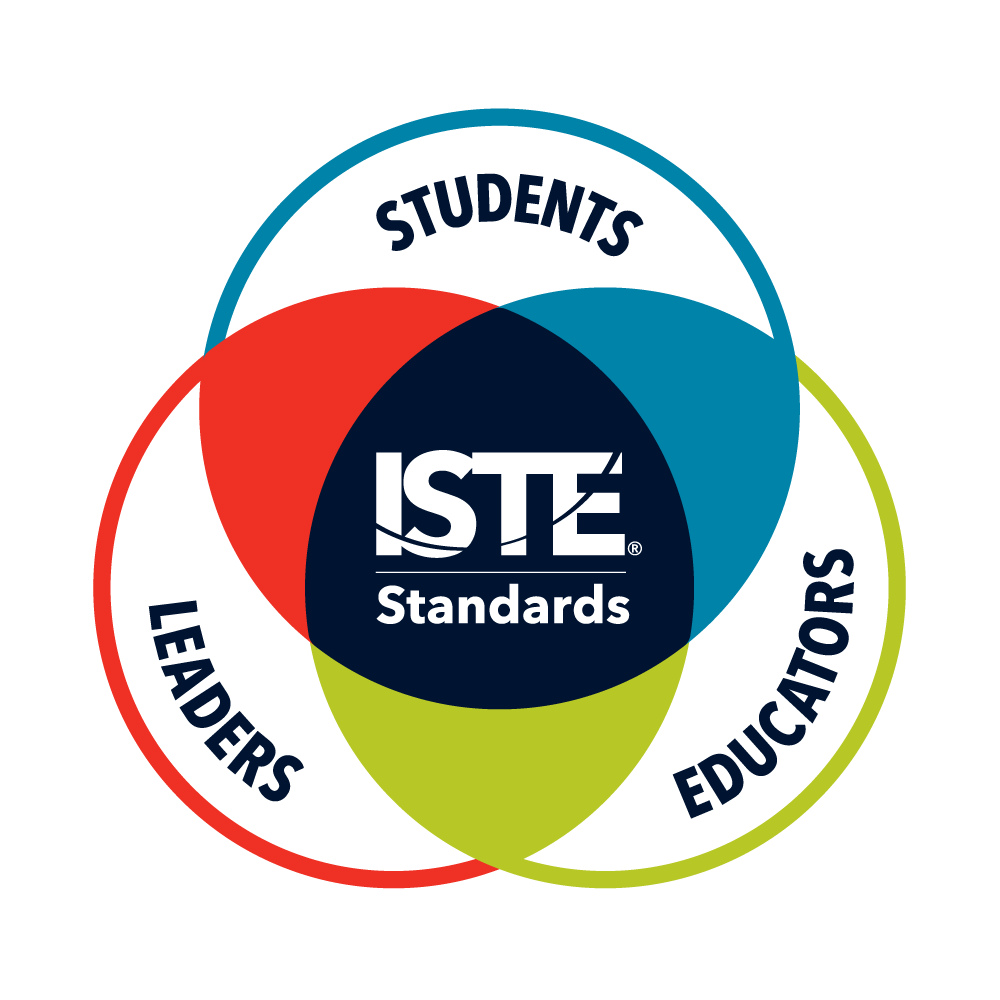
ISTE Standards Logo

The ISTE Standards, formerly known as the National Educational Technology Standards (NETS), are standards for the use of technology in teaching and learning (technology integration). They are published by the International Society for Technology in Education (ISTE), a nonprofit membership association for educators focused on educational technology. They include the ISTE Standards for Students, which list skills and attitudes expected of students. They also include the ISTE Standards for Educators, ISTE Standards for Administrators, ISTE Standards for Coaches and ISTE Standards for Computer Science Educators.

The ISTE Standards are designed to work with learning models such as Technological Pedagogical Content Knowledge (TPACK) and support the implementation of content-area standards, including the Common Core State Standards. They are often affiliated with new approaches to education, including project-based learning, blended learning, and the flipped classroom model.

== Resources related to the ISTE Standards ==
Resources to support the adoption and implementation of the ISTE Standards include the ISTE Essential Conditions, 14 elements needed to leverage technology for learning, and the ISTE Seal of Alignment, a program that reviews and recognizes resources for their alignment to the ISTE Standards.

ISTE also offers a certification program (ISTE Certification) aligned to the Standards. The certification program is a competency-based model where educators submit artifacts showing their ability to use technology to support learning. Upon successful completion of a peer-review process, educators are considered "ISTE Certified"

== History ==
ISTE released the first version of the Student Standards in 1998 under the name National Educational Technology Standards (NETS). At that time, the standards focused on technology skills in students. Standards for teachers and administrators followed in 2000 and 2001, respectively.

In 2007, ISTE reviewed its student standards and re-released them as the ISTE Standards for Students. Their focus became integration of technology in the classroom. ISTE then updated the ISTE Standards for Teachers (2008) and the ISTE Standards for Administrators (2009). In 2011, ISTE added two new sets of standards—the ISTE Standards for Coaches and the ISTE Standards for Computer Science Educators.

In 2015, ISTE began another review of the standards. The new ISTE Standards for Students were released in June 2016 at the 2016 ISTE Conference and Expo. The 2017 ISTE Standards for Teachers, renamed the ISTE Standards for Educators, were released in June 2017. The ISTE Standards for Administrators were renamed the ISTE Standards for Education Leaders and released in June 2018.

Also in 2018, to recognize the importance of computer science and STEM education as well as student problem-solving skills, ISTE released the ISTE Computational Thinking Competencies. In June 2019, ISTE will release a refreshed version of the ISTE Standards for Computer Science Educators.
