= Center for the Collaborative Classroom =

American nonprofit organization

- Founder: Eric Schaps
- Founded at: Alameda, California
- Type: Non-profit organization
- Website: www.collaborativeclassroom.org
- Formerly called: Developmental Studies Center

Center for the Collaborative Classroom (previously Developmental Studies Center) is a nonprofit organization headquartered in Alameda, California, that was founded in 1980 by Eric Schaps. Collaborative Classroom develops and disseminates literacy and community-building programs for use in elementary schools, and literacy, mathematics, and science enrichment programs for use in after-school environments, as well as provides professional development services tailored to each program.

Collaborative Classroom reaches over 30,000 new classrooms each year and supports itself largely through earned revenues. Collaborative Classroom's programs have been adopted in over 4,000 schools and 5,000 after-school sites across the United States, including Title I schools serving low-income and minority youth.

== Programs and services ==
For in-school use, Collaborative Classroom has created language arts programs that focus on decoding (i.e., phonemic awareness, phonics, and fluency), reading comprehension, vocabulary, spelling, and writing. Collaborative Classroom has also developed reading, mathematics, and science enrichment programs specifically designed for use in after-school environments. Aligned professional development is offered for each of these programs.

=== In-school learning ===
Collaborative Classroom has created research-based in-school programs that are designed to support teachers' learning as well as students', so that teachers with varying levels of experience can implement them successfully. and as a research-based drug abuse prevention program by The National Institute on Drug Abuse (NIDA). The program is also included in the National Registry of Evidence-based Programs and Practices and endorsed by the Substance Abuse and Mental Health Services Administration of the U.S. Department of Health and Human Services (SAMHSA).

=== Learning after school ===
Collaborative Classroom offers after-school enrichment programs that are focused on reading, math, and science.

=== Professional development ===
Collaborative Classroom supports each of its programs with tailored professional development services.

== Notes ==
1. Solomon, D., Battistich, V., Watson, M., Schaps, E., & Lewis, C. (2000), "A six-district study of educational change: Direct and mediated effects of the Child Development Project," Social Psychology of Education, 4, 3–51; and Munoz, M.A. & Vanderhaar, J.E. (2006). "Literacy-embedded character education in a large urban district: Effects of the Child Development Project on elementary school students and teachers." Journal of Research in Character Education, 4, 27–44.
