= Rose Education Foundation =

The Rose Education Foundation is a U.S.-based non-profit educational organization that seeks to provide high quality educational opportunities for children in Guatemala. The Rose Foundation works with Brigham Young University and Universidad Galileo to provide teacher training programs every summer in Guatemala City.

The mission of the Rose Foundation is to promote, support, and establish educational opportunities for children in disadvantaged areas of Guatemala. The foundation also seeks to strengthen individuals and families by encouraging and teaching valuable life skills, by developing honorable citizens and leaders, and by promoting educational excellence.

== History ==
The first Rose school began operations in 1997 through the financial support of founder Nedra Roney. Since that time, Roney has given the foundation a grant that provides for the entire current operating budget of the foundation. This grant allows 100% of donor contributions to be used exclusively for educating the students. In the beginning, there was one small school in Patzicia. In 1997, that school served approximately 50 children.

Two other schools have since been organized, one in Chimaltenango and the other in Momostenango. In addition to these schools, the Rose Foundation supports several other schools with training, administrative, and volunteer support. These schools have a combined enrollment of over 1,500 students. In November 1999, the foundation received recognition from the IRS as a 501(c)(3) public non-profit organization.

The Rose Education Foundation offices in Guatemala are located in Chimaltenango. Offices in the US are located in Provo, Utah.
