= EdSurge =

Educational technology company

- Website type: Trade website
- Available in: English
- Founded: February 2011; 15 years ago
- Headquarters: Burlingame, California
- Founders: Elizabeth Corcoran, Nick Punt
- Industry: Educational technology
- Parent: International Society for Technology in Education
- Website: edsurge.com

EdSurge is an education journalism website owned by the International Society for Technology in Education. The site publishes newsletters and operates databases related to education.

== History ==
EdSurge was founded in 2011 by Elizabeth Corcoran, a former executive editor of Forbes, and Nick Punt, a former product vice president at Inigral.

As of December 2015, the company had raised $5.6 million in funding.

EdSurge's managing editor, Tony Wan, was named in 2014 to Forbes "30 Under 30" list, and its senior editor, Mary Jo Madda, was named to the 2016 Forbes list.

In May 2018, EdSurge was identified by the Brookings Institution as one of the world's 16 leading "innovation spotters" in education.

In November 2019, the International Society for Technology in Education, a non-profit organization focused on education and technology, acquired EdSurge for an undisclosed amount. The acquisition made EdSurge into a nonprofit.
