= Galileo University =

University in Guatemala City

Location
- 7a. Avenue, Street Dr. Eduardo Suger Cofiño, Zone 10, Guatemala City, Guatemala
- Coordinates: 14.6094°N 90.5056°W

Information
- Type: Private
- Motto: La Revolución en la Educación
- Opened: October 31, 2000
- Enrollment: 45,000
- Newspaper
- Website: www.galileo.edu

Galileo University is a private university in Guatemala City. It was founded and authorized on October 31, 2000. Initially, it was the School of Computer Engineering (FISICC) of Universidad Francisco Marroquín. It stands out for its technological contribution in higher education in Guatemala.

== History ==
The university was founded as a school of systems, IT (Information Technology) and computer science engineering at Universidad Francisco Marroquín. In 1977 the school created Santo Domingo foundation, which came to assist in the educational, technological, cultural, and artistic heritage of Guatemala. After 22 years, the foundation initiated procedures for the approval of a new university. It was authorized by the Superior Council of Private Education in October 31, 2000 as a university. The name honors astronomer and mathematician Galileo Galilei.

== Buildings ==
The university has three towers, each identified with the name of an astronomer. The first is called Galileo, the second Copernicus, and the third Kepler.

== Schools ==
Galileo university has seven schools:

- School of Systems, Information Technology and Computer Science Engineering (FISICC)
- School of Science, Technology, and Industry (FACTI)
- School of Education (FACED)
- School of Communication Science (FACOM)
- School of Sport Science and Technology (FACTEDE)
- School of Biology, Chemistry, and Pharmacy (FABIQ)
- School of Construction Engineering (FICON)
- School of Health Science (FACISA)

== Vocational schools ==
It has seven vocational schools:

- Art School (ESA)
- School of Continuing Education (ESEC)
- School of Diplomacy and International Relations (ESDRI)
- Technical School (ESTEC)
- School of Public Image (ESIP)
- School and Professional Development (ESDAP)

== Institutes ==
It has six institutes:

- Open Learning Institute (IDEA)
- Institute for Security Studies (IES)
- Research Institute for Earth Science and Astronomy (IICT)
- Energy Resources Institute (IRE)
- Institute of Family Studies (ICF)
- Von Neumann Institute (IVN)

== Galileo Educational System ==
Galileo Educational System (GES) is an online education platform, which serves to support courses and as the real environment of online courses at Galileo University. Is adapted by the university on the platform dotLRN, which is supported by its presence in many prestigious universities such as MIT, the University of Heidelberg or the UNED of Spain, among others. The platform is active 24 hours a day, 365 days a year.

Guarantee the import and export of course content, classroom materials, homework, tests, etc. And the administration of courses, qualifying and post notes, directly online. Students have the ability to respond tests, homework, projects, etc. Participate in discussion forums in courses, FAQs, view course materials, among others.

== Administration ==
- President, Dr. José Eduardo Suger Cofiño
- Vice President, Dra. Mayra Roldán de Ramírez
- Vice President Administrative, Lic. Jean Paul Suger
- Secretary General, Lic. Jorge Francisco Retolaza MSc.
