= Institute for Student Achievement =

Organization in New York City, United States

The Institute for Student Achievement (ISA) partnered with schools and school districts to improve secondary education, particularly for students who are historically underserved. ISA was founded in 1990 by philanthropists Gerard and Lilo Leeds, became a division of Educational Testing Service (ETS) in 2013, and supported schools and school districts in New Jersey, Maryland, Virginia, New York, Ohio, North Carolina, Michigan, California, Georgia, Pennsylvania, and other states.

Since 2017, the organization was led by Dr. Stephanie Wood-Garnett. From 2000 to 2016, the organization was headed by Dr. Gerry House, formerly school superintendent of the Memphis, Tennessee school system.

In 2015, ISA was approved by the United States Department of Education as a whole-school reform model, having submitted at least one study that met the What Works Clearinghouse standards.

ISA's school improvement model was framed by what its website describes as seven "research-based principles" leading to greater student achievement and improved high school graduation and "college-going" rates.

In October 2019, Learning Policy Institute published a brief about ISA partner school Bronxdale High School, called Teaching the Way Students Learn Best.

On January 4, 2024, ISA ceased to exist.
