= International Society for Technology in Education =

Nonprofit organization

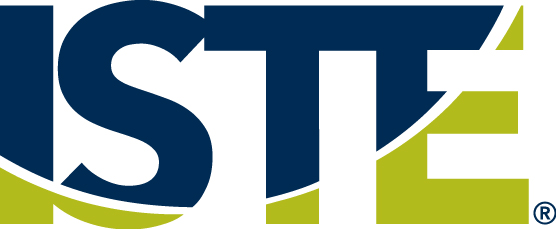
- Abbreviation: ISTE
- Formation: 1979; 47 years ago
- Founder: David Moursund and a group of K-12 and University of Oregon educators
- Type: 501(c)(3) non-profit
- Headquarters: Washington, DC, United States
- Region served: Worldwide
- Key people: Jeremy Owoh, Board President; Richard Culatta, CEO
- Staff: 100
- Website: iste.org
- Formerly called: International Council for Computers in Education

The International Society for Technology in Education (ISTE) is a nonprofit organization that focuses on accelerating innovation in education through the smart use of technology in education. ISTE provides a variety of services to support professional learning for educators and education leaders, including ISTELive—an ed tech event, the ISTE Standards for learning, teaching and leading with technology, and ISTE Certification. ISTE also provides a suite of professional learning resources, including webinars, online courses, consulting services, books, and peer-reviewed journals and publications.

== History ==
The International Council for Computers in Education (ICCE) was founded in 1979, with David Moursund as executive officer and editor-in-chief of the organization's organ The Computing Teacher. In 1989 ICCE merged with the International Association for Computing in Education (IACE) to become the International Society for Technology in Education (ISTE). Shortly after, in 1990, The Computing Teacher was retitled Learning and Leading with Technology.

In the 1990s, the National Education Computing Association (NECA) organized and produced what became the largest edtech conference in the United States: the National Education Computing Conference (NECC). ISTE was their primary partner (and largest contractor) in handling the production of the event. In 1999, the two organizations reached an agreement to merge all operations into ISTE. The last time the conference was branded as NECC was in 2009.

In 2019, ISTE acquired EdSurge, a for-profit news company, which focuses on technology and education, and converted it to a non-profit.

In 2023 ISTE merged with ASCD to form the largest education non-profit focused on supporting educators in creating effective learning experiences for students. The merger brings together the instructional expertise of ASCD with the innovation expertise of ISTE. The merged organization is led by Richard Culatta, who previously served as the Chief Innovation Officer for the State of Rhode Island and Executive Director at the US Department of Education.

ISTE+ASCD is governed by a Board of Directors, which includes the CEO.

== Conferences and events ==
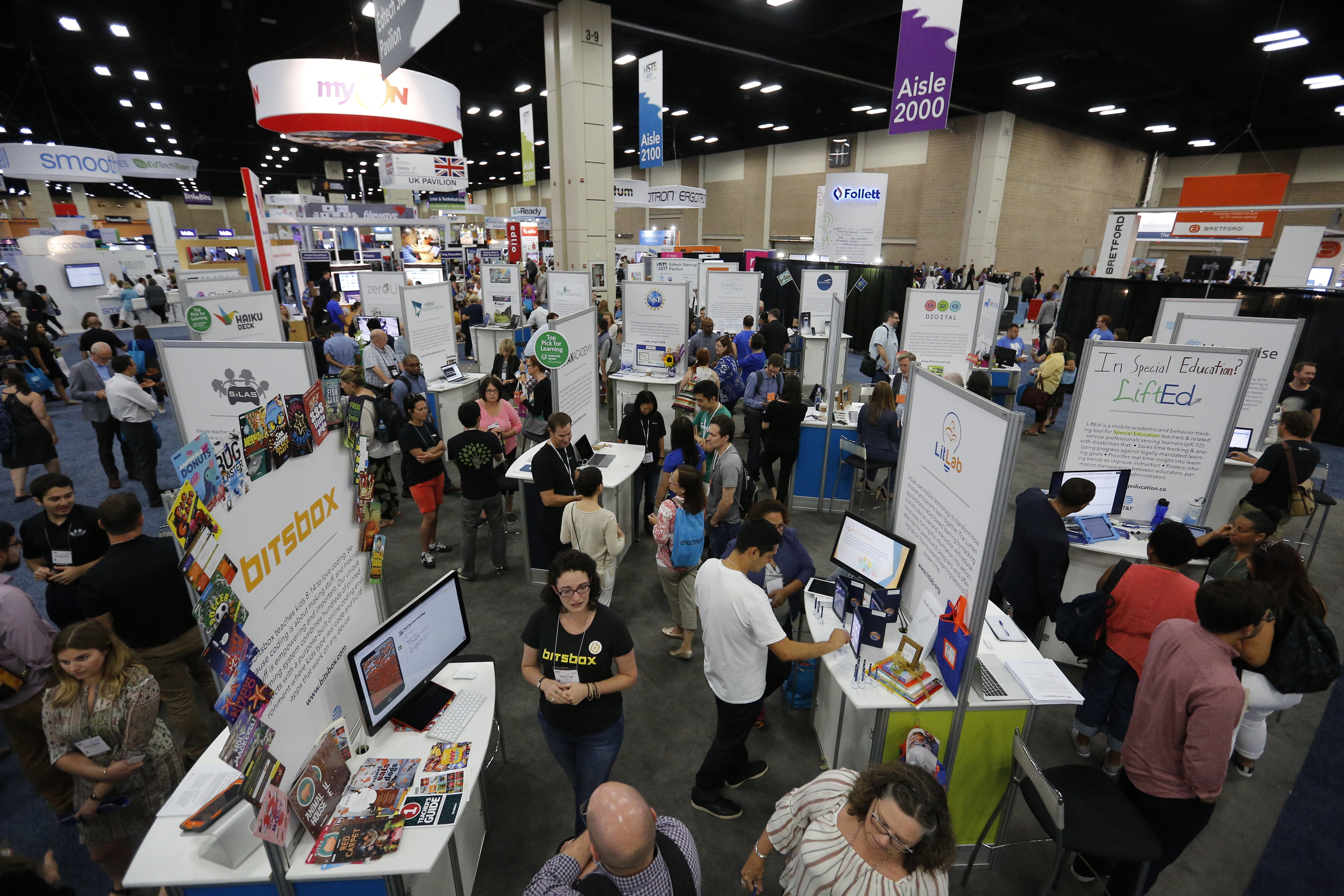
Picture of the Startup Pavilion at the ISTE Conference

ISTE is known for hosting a variety of events related to innovation in elementary, secondary, and higher education.

=== ISTELive ===
ISTELive is ISTE's flagship conference for exploring and exchanging approaches for innovation in education with educators from around the world. The event attracts more than 24,000 educators and education leaders. Recent conferences have been held in Philadelphia, Pennsylvania (2019), Chicago, Illinois (2018), San Antonio, Texas (2017), and Denver, Colorado (2016). In 2020, the ISTE Conference was scheduled to be held in Anaheim, California but was instead held virtually due to the COVID-19 pandemic; the 2021 Conference was also fully virtual. ISTELive 22 was the first ISTE event since 2019 to be held in-person in New Orleans, Louisiana. though it will also have a virtual component. In 2024 ASCD+ISTE announced that ISTELive would be co-located with the ASCD Annual Conference beginning in 2025 in San Antonio.

=== Other events ===
In addition to ISTELive, ISTE hosts a variety of smaller events around specific topics. Beginning in 2018 ISTE began hosting Creative Constructor Lab, a virtual event which focuses on using technology to support design and creative thinking. ISTE also hosts the Leadership Exchange (Lx) for education leaders and the EdTech Industry Summit for product developers. In 2022 ISTE began a new event, Make the Future Summit, for education leaders in the UK.

== ISTE Standards ==
The ISTE Standards (formerly "National Educational Technology Standards", NETS) are a framework for implementing digital strategies in education to positively impact learning, teaching and leading. Along with the standards themselves, ISTE offers information and resources to support understanding and implementation of the standards at a variety of levels.

== Publications ==
=== EdSurge ===
In November 2019, ISTE announced the acquisition of EdSurge in a pairing of events and news-focused education technology organizations. Terms of the deal were not disclosed, but ISTE CEO Richard Culatta stated that its investors will not receive a return on their investment. EdSurge continues to operate as an independent news organization focusing on reporting around innovation in elementary/secondary education, higher education, and the education industry.

=== Print publications ===
ISTE also publishes books focused on innovation in education, with titles on topics such as sketchnoting, blended learning, artificial intelligence, and augmented and virtual realities. In addition ISTE publishes two peer-reviewed journals: 1) the Journal of Research on Technology in Education (JRTE), and the 2) Journal of Digital Learning in Teacher Education (JDLTE). Both JRTE and JDLTE are currently published by Taylor & Francis. In 2018, JRTE published its 50th volume. JRTE is published bi-monthly with an acceptance rate at approximately 7%.

== Professional Learning ==
ISTE provides professional development opportunities on a range of educational topics, including digital citizenship, computational thinking, artificial intelligence, and online teaching. The organization offers professional learning for a wide variety of educator roles, including ed tech coaches, library media specialists, and classroom educators and school leaders. In June 2020, ISTE launched a Summer Learning Academy to prepare teachers to be effective at teaching online as many districts cancelled face to face instruction as a result of COVID-19.

The ISTE Certification for Educators credential is a competency-based, vendor-neutral teacher certification based on the ISTE Standards for Educators. It recognizes educators who use ed tech for learning effectively. The process to obtain this credential has three parts: a two-day, in-person training workshop, a five- to eight-week online course (led by a professional development facilitator and with a cohort), and a final submission of a portfolio of artefacts to ISTE for review and evaluation. The certification program is delivered through ISTE-selected Certification Authorized Providers across the world.

In 2022 ISTE announced that, pending a vote by the ASCD members, the two organizations would merge to form a new organization that had expanded professional learning reach and options.

== Grant Work ==
ISTE collaborates with education organizations in several ways, including grants. ISTE's grant work includes developing professional learning programs that incorporate educational technology best practices across various topics. Current ISTE grant programs include a learning science initiative (2018–2019) funded by the Chan Zuckerberg Foundation, an artificial intelligence explorations program (2018–2019) funded by GM, an educational technology initiative focused on retail and workforce development funded by Walmart, a 2018 open education resources initiative funded by Hewlett Foundation, and a collaboration on future-ready librarianship funded by Follet.

== Membership ==
ISTE membership is extended to individuals, affiliates (organizations, like school districts and state technology organizations), and corporate members interested in the use and application of technology in Education. ISTE has members in over 100 countries with concentrations in the US, Canada, Latin America, and Australia. ISTE also maintains a corporate membership program to support companies in developing high quality ed tech products.
