= "Superstar" Billy Graham =

American wrestler (1943–2023)

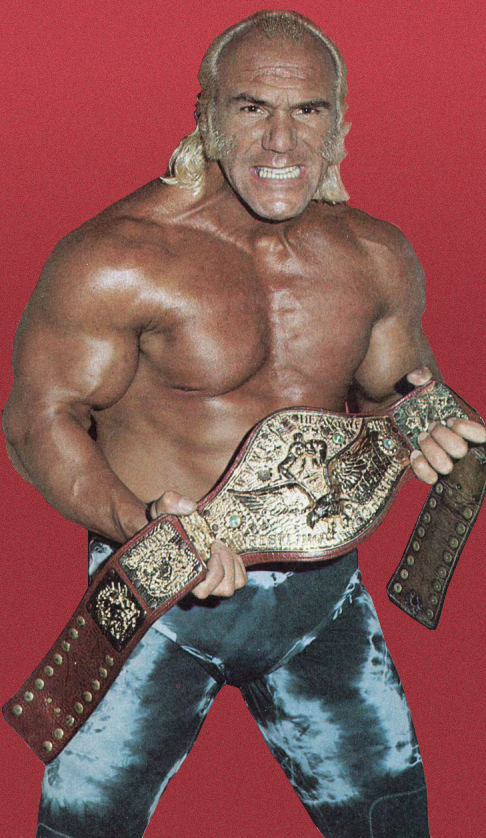
- Graham as WWWF World Champion, c. 1977

Personal information
- Born: Eldridge Wayne Coleman; June 7, 1943 Phoenix, Arizona, U.S.
- Died: May 17, 2023 (aged 79) Phoenix, Arizona, U.S.
- Spouse: Valerie Belkas Coleman (m. 1978)
- Children: 2

Professional wrestling career
- Ring name(s): "Superstar" Billy Graham; Wayne Coleman
- Billed height: 6 ft 4 in (193 cm)
- Billed weight: 275 lb (125 kg)
- Billed from: Paradise Valley, Arizona
- Trained by: Stu Hart
- Debut: 1970
- Retired: November 7, 1987

Eldridge Wayne Coleman Jr. (June 7, 1943 – May 17, 2023), better known by his ring name "Superstar" Billy Graham, was an American professional wrestler. He gained recognition for his tenure as the WWWF Heavyweight Champion from 1977 to 1978. He was a three-time world champion in major professional wrestling promotions. As an award-winning bodybuilder, he was a training partner and close friend of Arnold Schwarzenegger. He was most remembered for revolutionizing the interview and physique aspects of the professional wrestling industry, and for his charismatic performance style.

== Early life ==
Coleman was born into a working-class family in Phoenix, Arizona, on June 7, 1943. His father Eldridge was from Mississippi and drove phone poles into the ground for a power company but developed multiple sclerosis and was reassigned to light office work. His mother Juanita, who claimed Cherokee ancestry, was from Arkansas. Coleman was attracted to weight lifting in the fifth grade. As a teenager, he was an avid reader of bodybuilding magazines, his idols being Steve Reeves and John Grimek. As a teenager, he became a devout Christian and traveled to religious revivals where he incorporated feats of strength into his sermons. Wayne was often beaten by his father due to his jealousy of Wayne's physique, but one day, he was able to yank the leather strap from his father's fingers; his mother also hit him with a brick on his head "because he was too big to hit with anything else".

Coleman attended North High School, where he was a track and field star and a shot put champion. He also dabbled in amateur and professional boxing, participating in the 1959 Golden Gloves.

Coleman played for the Waterbury Orbits of the Atlantic Coast Football League in 1966. He was a member of the Oakland Raiders of the American Football League in 1967 but did not play in a game. In 1968, Coleman tried out for the Canadian Football League's Calgary Stampeders, but he was traded to the Montreal Alouettes and played in only five games while there. He played for the Las Vegas Cowboys of the Continental Football League in 1969. He also worked as a debt collector. In between football engagements, he worked as a bouncer at a bar in Phoenix.

== Bodybuilding career ==
In 1961, Coleman was the winner of the West Coast division of the Mr. Teenage America bodybuilding contest (Frank Zane won the East Coast division), and his photo appeared soon after in Bob Hoffman's Strength and Fitness magazine. Coleman began to train intensively in 1968 at Gold's Gym in Santa Monica, where he worked out with Dave Draper, Franco Columbu and Arnold Schwarzenegger. At this time he was able to bench press 605 lbs (the world record, held by his friend Pat Casey, was 616 lbs). One of Coleman's photo shoots with Schwarzenegger was featured that year in Joe Weider's Muscle Fitness magazine.

When Coleman decided to become a professional wrestler two years later, he had the inspiration of marrying wrestling to bodybuilding. As a wrestler, he weight-trained continually, and in 1975 prepared for the World Bodybuilding Guild's Pro Mr. America contest in New York City, where his 22-inch biceps won first place in the Best Developed Arms division. At the peak of his wrestling career in 1977, Coleman weighed 275 lbs. From 1978, he gained more weight and in 1980, at 325 lbs, he took part in the World's Strongest Man competition in Great Gorge, New Jersey. He finished seventh in this contest despite injuring himself in one of the events. On December 6 of the same year, Coleman hosted the U.S. Invitational Powerlifting Championship in Phoenix, Arizona.

== Professional wrestling career ==
=== Early years (1969–1972) ===
In 1969, Coleman was encouraged by football player and occasional professional wrestler Bob Lueck to train with Stu Hart for the latter's Stampede Wrestling promotion. He trained under Hart in Calgary before debuting on January 16, 1970, in a match with Dan Kroffat. After wrestling briefly under his real name, Coleman traveled back to the United States in May, wrestling for a few months with Dr. Jerry Graham, Brick Darrow, Rick Cahill and Ron Pritchard in Arizona before he and Jerry joined the National Wrestling Alliance's Los Angeles promotion (run by Mike LeBell) as a tag team the following August. He changed his ring name to Billy Graham, as a tribute to the famous evangelist of the same name. Jerry also told him to dye his hair blonde with a bottle of Clairol. While wrestling in Championship Wrestling from Florida, the name served both as his ring name and to make him the (kayfabe) youngest brother of Jerry and the other Graham Brothers (Eddie and Luke).

In late December, Graham went north to join Roy Shire's NWA San Francisco promotion, working with Pat Patterson (his tag-team partner), Ray Stevens, Cyclone Negro, and Peter Maivia. Graham's nearly two-year run in central California included a stint wrestling in Hawaii in February and March 1972. It was during his Californian period that Graham developed a new aspect of his character; before a match he would stage an arm wrestling contest, encouraging public challenges to his title of "Arm Wrestling Champion of the World".

=== American Wrestling Association (1972–1975) ===
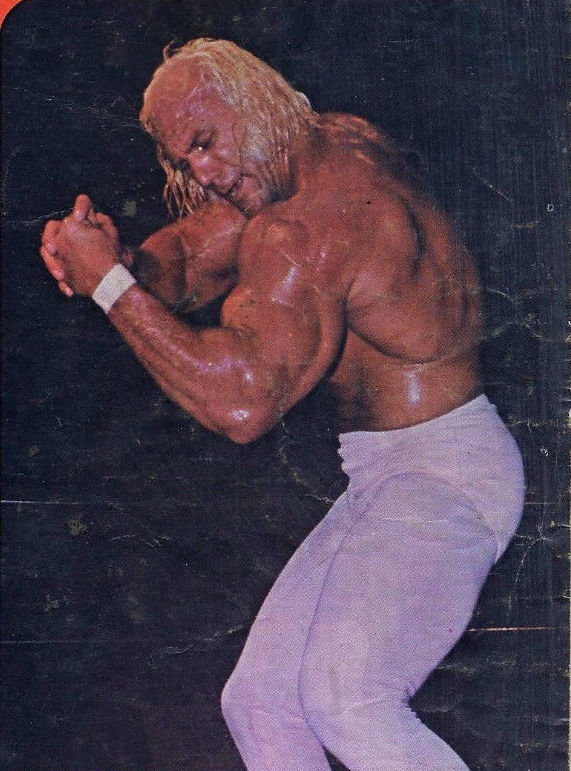
Graham in 1975

During his time with the AWA, Graham feuded with Gagne, The Crusher, The Bruiser, Wahoo McDaniel, Billy Robinson, Ken Patera and Ivan Koloff, the latter becoming his tag-team partner. By this time, Graham was integrating into his performances not only arm wrestling contests but also weightlifting challenges (mainly involving ex-Olympian Ken Patera) and posing routines. One of his most memorable and violent feuds was against McDaniel, with whom he wrestled numerous bouts between 1973 and 1974. In the AWA, he also began his career feud with "Polish Power" Ivan Putski; the feud would also occur when anti-Polish phrases were being frequently spouted by Archie Bunker against his irreligious Polish-American son-in-law Michael Stivic on lead American television series All In The Family.

In September and October 1974, Graham took leave from the AWA to join the International Wrestling Enterprise's "Super Wide Series" tour of Japan, where he fought such local stars as Mighty Inoue, Animal Hamaguchi and Rusher Kimura. Following his return from Japan, Graham formed a tag team with Dusty Rhodes. He left the AWA and returned to the NWA in May 1975, signing up with Red Bastien's Dallas-based promotion for five months and taking the local "Brass Knucks" title from Mad Dog Vachon on August 8. For most of October, Graham worked for the Mid Atlantic promotion in North Carolina, standing in for Ric Flair, who had just been injured in a plane crash.

=== World Wide Wrestling Federation and return to NWA (1975–1976) ===
Graham made his in–ring debut in the World Wide Wrestling Federation (WWWF) on October 25, 1975, in a tag team match at the Boston Garden, in which he and Spiros Arion defeated WWWF Heavyweight Champion Bruno Sammartino and Dominic De Nucci. During this time, The Grand Wizard became Graham's manager.

A brief contract with the NWA in Houston, Texas, followed from June to August 1976, after which Graham went on his second tour of Japan, this time accompanied by Ivan Koloff. He feuded with Antonio Inoki during this Japanese run. After returning to America, Graham and Koloff made an unsuccessful attempt to launch their own wrestling promotion in Southern California. In November, on the invitation of Dusty Rhodes, Graham joined the NWA promotion in Florida, beating Rhodes for the Florida heavyweight title on November 22 at the West Palm Beach Auditorium. His work in this period included occasional visits to St Louis, Missouri, where he took on NWA World Heavyweight Champion Harley Race.

=== Return to WWWF (1977–1978) ===
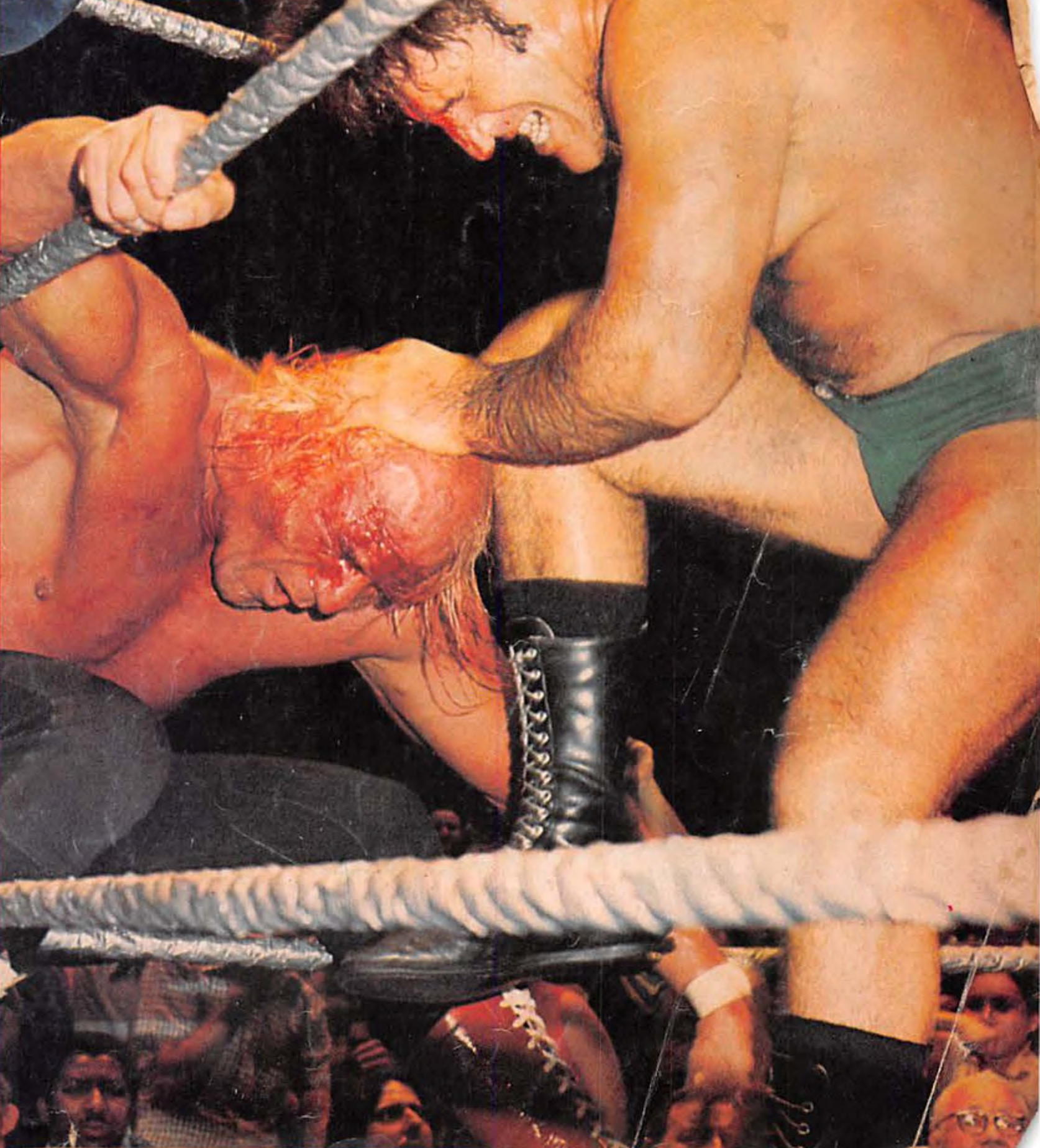
A bloody battle between Graham (left) and Bruno Sammartino (right), circa 1978

Graham defeated Bruno Sammartino for the WWWF Heavyweight Championship on April 30, 1977, in Baltimore, Maryland, after putting his feet on the ropes. During his reign, he wrestled across America and Japan, facing challengers such as former champion Bruno Sammartino, Jack Brisco, Dusty Rhodes, Pedro Morales, Don Muraco, Mil Mascaras, Strong Kobayashi, Carlos Rocha and Riki Choshu. On January 25, 1978, in Miami, Florida, at the Orange Bowl football stadium, Graham wrestled against then-NWA World Heavyweight Champion Harley Race in a WWWF Heavyweight Championship vs. NWA World Heavyweight Championship unification match which ended in a one-hour time-limit draw.

Graham eventually lost the title to Bob Backlund on February 20, 1978. Another feud Graham had as champion was with Dusty Rhodes, which culminated in a Texas Bullrope match. His confrontations with Rhodes continued after Graham had been forced to drop the belt to Backlund. Rhodes himself, a long-time friend of Graham's, recalled these matches with Graham in 1978 as among the most exciting and memorable of his career.

=== Return to NWA and hiatus (1978–1982) ===
Disillusioned by the loss of his belt, Graham left the WWWF in December 1978 and accepted an offer to join Paul Boesch's promotion in Houston, Texas, lending himself out for other NWA events in California and Florida as well. In April 1979, he embarked on his third IWA tour of Japan. On October 8, Graham became the Continental Wrestling Association (CWA) World Champion, defeating Pat McGuinness. On November 8, Graham lost the belt to Jerry Lawler in Lexington, Kentucky.

In 1980, he only wrestled in Houston and focused more on strongman competitions. During this time he shaved his head bald and grew a beard and moustache.

Graham wrestled only three matches (one in Windsor, Ontario, Canada and two in Los Angeles) in 1981, and was reported to have died on November 8. However, that report was false and started by Dusty Rhodes as a joke. He also worked in Phoenix for pipe sprinklers. In 1982, he spent some time competing in Japan and the United States, adding some martial arts techniques to his repertoire.

=== Second return to WWF (1982–1983) ===
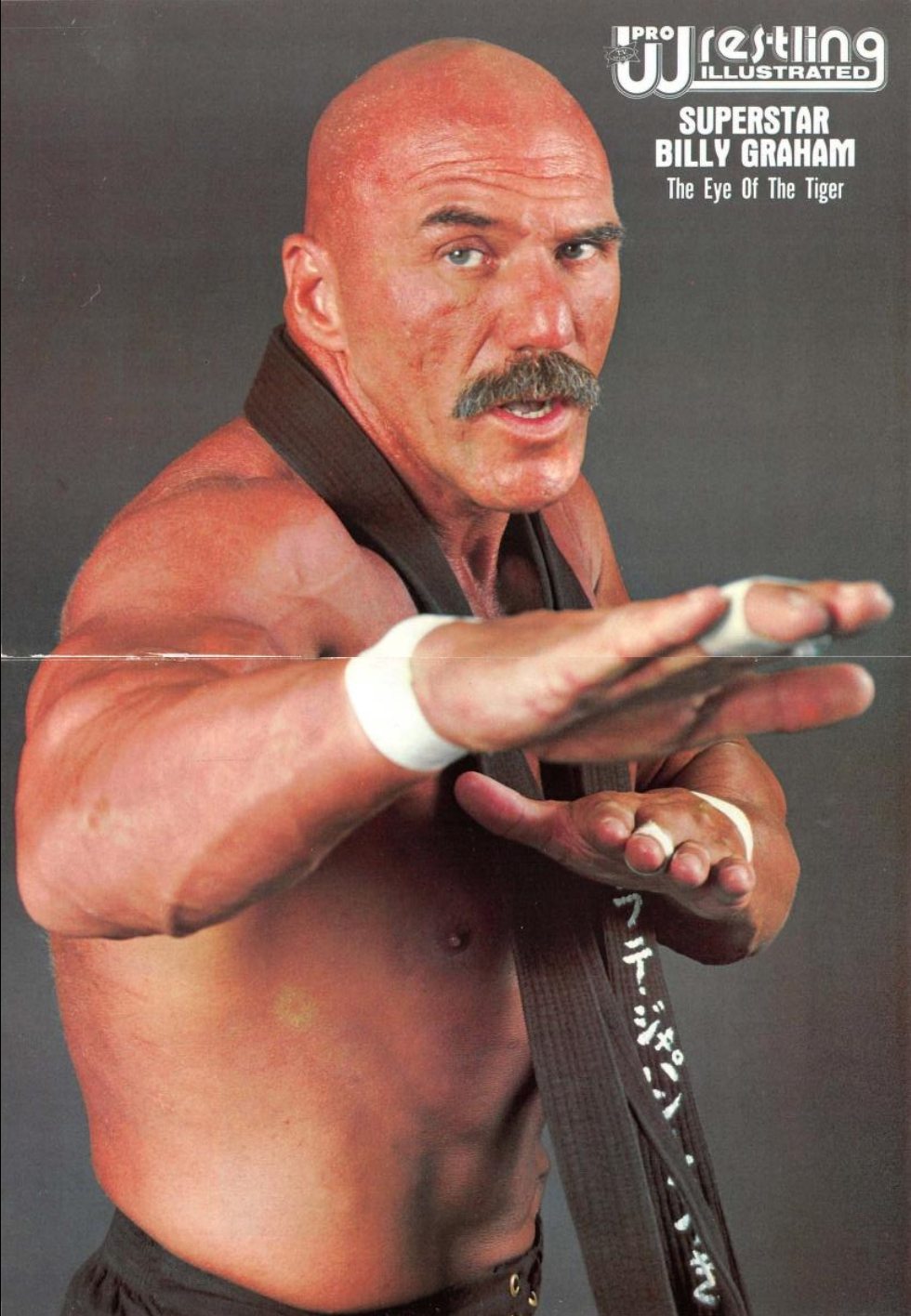
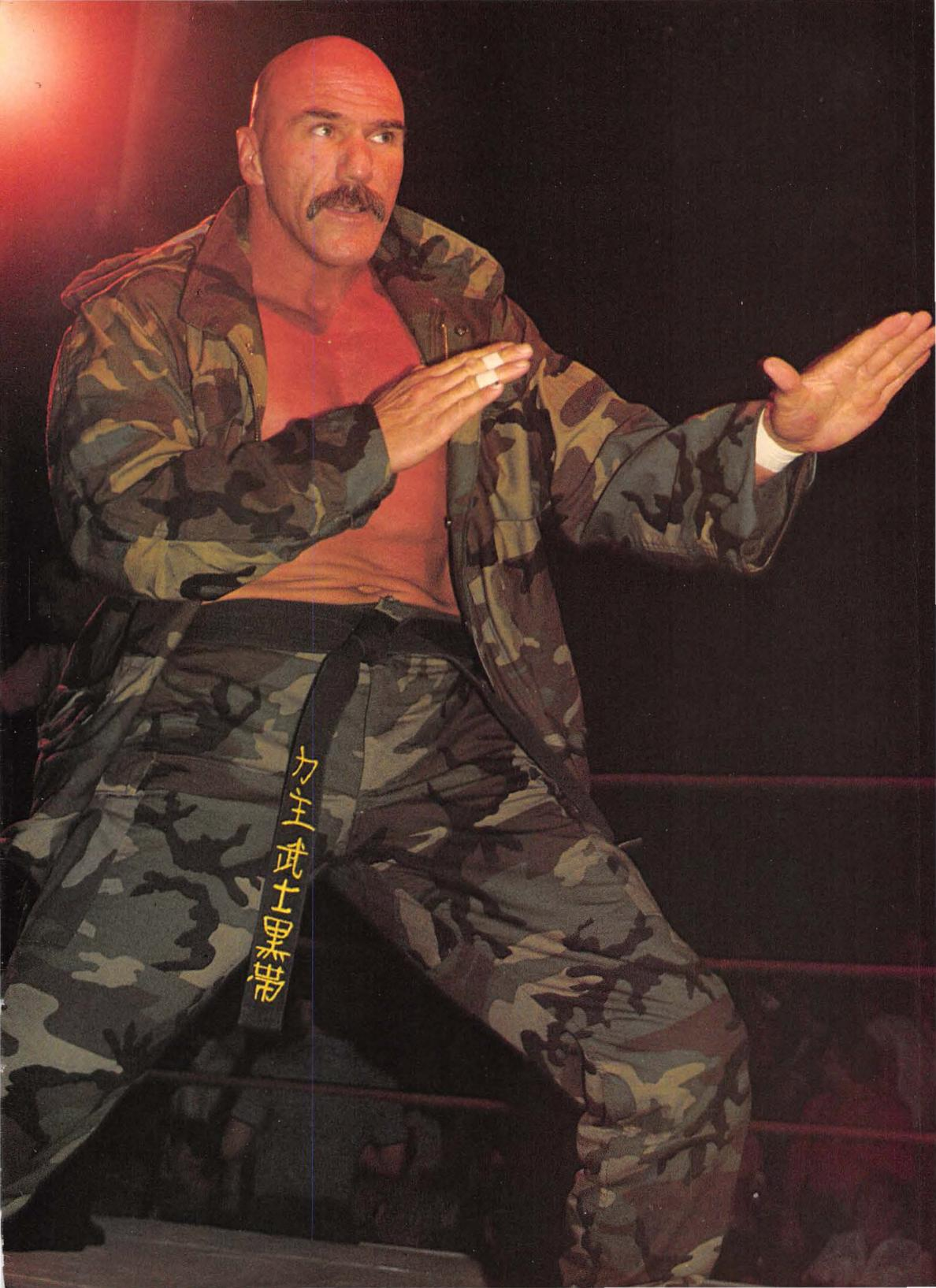
In 1983, Graham radically altered his look and persona as part of a return to the WWF

Graham returned to the now-renamed World Wrestling Federation (WWF) in August 1982. He debuted in the promotion with an entirely new look: leaner, with a bald head and mustache, and sporting black karate pants. Graham later stated that he wanted to retire the "Superstar" character out of frustration with Vince McMahon Sr. for not letting him become a fan favorite. After his return, he attacked Backlund, destroying his championship belt. He challenged Backlund for the WWF Championship, but was unable to win the title and left the promotion in April 1983.

=== Return to AWA and third return to NWA (1983–1986) ===
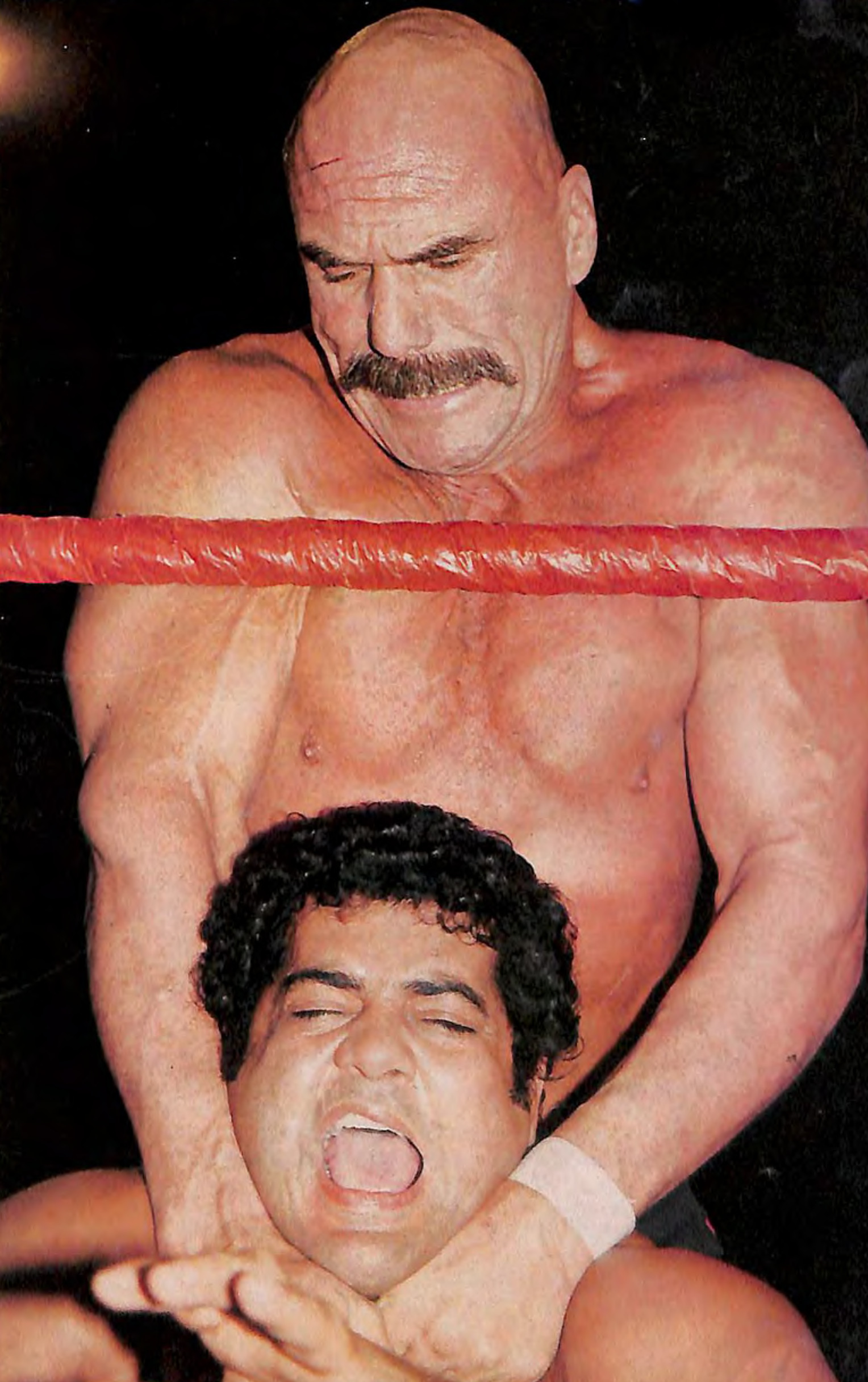
Graham (top) wrestling Pedro Morales (bottom), circa 1983

Graham signed up with the AWA again in October 1983, and by the following year, he had regained his earlier body weight. In April 1984, he began his NWA run with Championship Wrestling from Florida, first as a member of Kevin Sullivan's Army of Darkness and later as the group's opponent after he was tired of Sullivan's abuse of his valet, The Lock, and stopped Sullivan from beating her at ringside. In November, Graham joined Jim Crockett Promotions (Mid-Atlantic Wrestling) in North Carolina, working for Paul Jones in his feud against Jimmy Valiant. It was during this stint, in the summer of 1985, that Graham bulked up further, and returned to his tie-dyed look, growing a full goatee and dyeing the mustache blond. His theme music during this time was "Bad to the Bone" by George Thorogood.

=== Third return to the WWF (1986–1989) ===
Graham returned to the WWF one more time in June 1986, now as a fan favorite. After a few appearances, it was diagnosed in August that he required a hip replacement. The footage of Graham's hip replacement surgery was shown on WWF TV on September 27 as a means of promoting his comeback. He returned in mid-1987, but the strain on his hip and ankles proved to be too much. In Syracuse on October 27, the One Man Gang supposedly retired him from active competition permanently with a running splash on the concrete floor after Graham's win over Butch Reed. In this incident, aired on the November 14, 1987, episode of Superstars, Don Muraco came to Graham's aid, and Graham subsequently became Muraco's manager. On November 4, 1987, Graham defeated Butch Reed in a steel cage match in Halifax, Nova Scotia. Graham's last wrestling match, also against Butch Reed and at 44 years of age, actually took place on November 7, in St Louis, Missouri. Over the next year, in between bouts of surgery, Graham worked for the WWF as a commentator until 1989.

=== Fourth return to WWE (2004–2009) ===
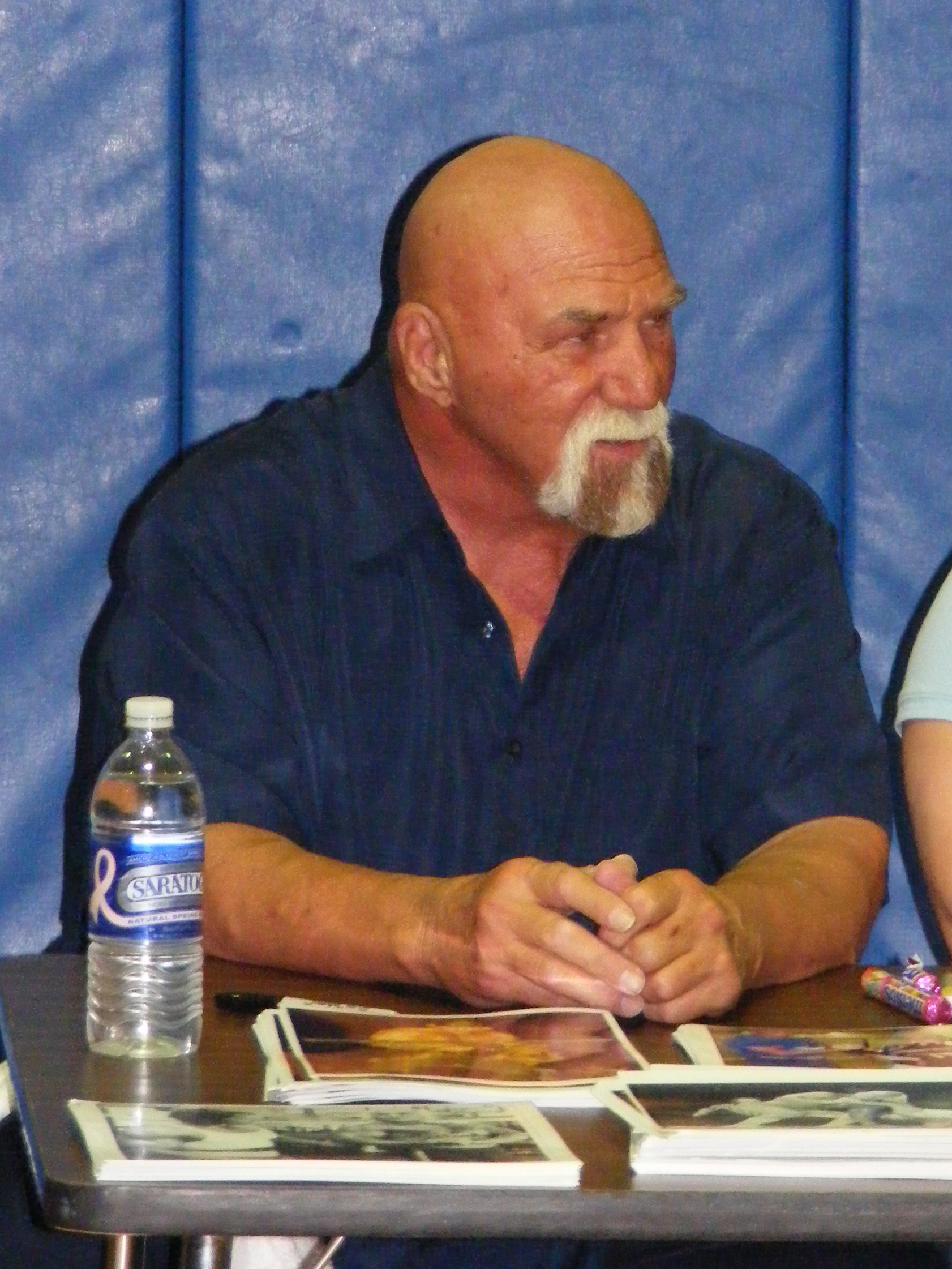
Graham in 2008

On March 14, 2004, Graham was inducted into the WWE Hall of Fame class of 2004, the night before WrestleMania XX, by then-World Heavyweight Champion Triple H, whom Graham had helped inspire to become a professional wrestler. Graham later sold his WWE Hall of Fame ring to purchase anti-rejection medications to help treat his liver transplant.

Several months later, Graham joined WWE on a swing of nine televised events where he was interviewed by Jonathan Coachman (on December 28) before performing a skit which ended with Coachman getting knocked out. On February 25, 2005, Graham appeared at another live event and was again interviewed by Coachman before knocking him out. Three days later, Graham appeared on Raw, where he encouraged Randy Orton to do something to make himself notable. On October 3 at WWE Homecoming, Graham participated in a Legends Ceremony with 24 other WWE legends. On the January 23, 2006, episode of Raw, he promoted his book and DVD. Graham parted ways with WWE in 2009.

=== Fifth return to WWE (2015–2023) ===
In November 2015, Graham announced that he had signed a legends contract (a long-term deal to make infrequent, non-wrestling appearances) in a Facebook post. He signed a renewed five-year contract in 2021.

== Personal life and death ==
=== Family ===
Graham was first married to Shirley Potts. He had two children from his marriage to Madelyn Miluso: his daughter Capella was born June 8, 1972 and was named after a star Graham read about in the Atlas of the Universe. His son Joey was born March 18, 1975. Joey was born with double pneumonia and an enlarged heart, which was later surgically corrected. Joey's godfather was wrestler Dusty Rhodes. As stated in his autobiography Tangled Ropes, Graham and his third wife Valerie Belkas, whom he married in 1978, were never able to have children.

=== Health issues ===
After contracting hepatitis C, Graham received a liver transplant in 2002 from a 26-year-old female donor, who had died in a car crash. He had cirrhosis at the time of his transplant. Graham was again hospitalized on May 24, 2006, due to a bowel obstruction from an earlier surgery.

In July 2010, Graham was hospitalized due to liver problems. Afterward, he announced that he probably only had one year left to live without another liver transplant. He reserved a burial spot at the Green Acres cemetery in Scottsdale, Arizona, next to Eddie Guerrero. On March 31, 2011, The Phoenix New Times reported that Graham's doctor, Hector Rodriguez-Luna, acknowledged that Graham's advanced fibrosis may have been early cirrhosis and that he could live for two more years if he took Interferon—a drug to help slow his hepatitis C—and stayed in shape. By 2012, Graham was diagnosed with third-stage liver disease and cirrhosis.

On January 17, 2013, Graham was hospitalized with double pneumonia and possible heart failure. He was re-hospitalized for a liver complication in October 2014.

On August 2, 2016, Graham was hospitalized while undergoing a medical procedure due to internal bleeding; he underwent surgery the next day to identify the cause of the issues.

In June 2022, it was announced that he needed to have his toes amputated due to an infection.

=== Death ===
Graham was hospitalized in January 2023 as a result of an ear and skull infection that had left him deaf. By April, his condition had worsened; he had lost 80 pounds and was being treated for kidney, heart and lung problems. He died of sepsis and multiple organ failure on May 17, 2023, after having been placed on life support earlier that week.

== Legacy ==
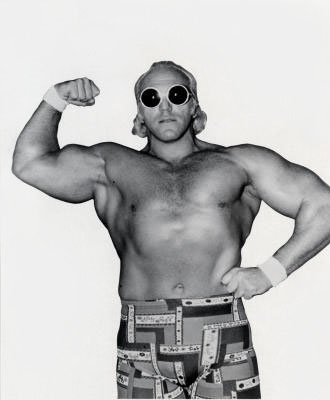
Graham's look influenced generations of other professional wrestlers (1975)

"Superstar" Billy Graham is widely regarded as a pioneering figure in professional wrestling, whose flamboyant persona and promotional style had a lasting influence on the industry. Wrestling journalist Dave Meltzer of the Wrestling Observer Newsletter characterized his impact as foundational, stating, "If it wasn't for Billy Graham, this industry would be so much different than it is." Roberta Morgan, in her 1979 kayfabe book Main Event, observed that Graham's popularity endured despite his status as a villainous character, attributing it to his "skill, strength, and colorful personality". During his tenure with the WWWF, Graham headlined 19 sold-out events at Madison Square Garden, the promotion's primary venue at the time.

Graham's distinctive approach to professional wrestling served as a blueprint for future performers. His heavily muscled physique, charismatic promos, and fashion-forward presentation were emulated by several prominent wrestlers, including Ric Flair, Austin Idol, Steve Austin, Scott Steiner, Triple H, Hulk Hogan, Jesse Ventura and Randy Savage. A hallmark of his interview style was his frequent use of the term "brother", a verbal tic rooted in his early exposure to evangelical revival meetings, where the term was commonly used among attendees. This linguistic quirk became a fixture in wrestling vernacular, later popularized by Hogan and adopted by many others in the profession.

Later in life, Graham became an outspoken critic of steroid use in professional sports, frequently addressing the health risks associated with performance-enhancing drugs. Drawing from his own experiences, he delivered lectures to young athletes and participated in public discussions on the issue. His autobiography, Tangled Ropes, was published by WWE on January 10, 2006, offering a candid account of his career and personal challenges. WWE also released a biographical documentary, 20 Years Too Soon: The "Superstar" Billy Graham Story, and a follow-up feature, "Superstar" Billy Graham: Full Disclosure, was issued in 2013 by Seriocity Productions.

=== Criticism of WWE ===
In the early 1990s, U.S. federal agents were investigating Dr. George Zahorian, a Harrisburg, Pennsylvania, physician who had been dispensing anabolic steroids and other drugs to wrestlers at WWF events. In 1991, Dr. Zahorian was convicted under the U.S. federal Anti-Drug Abuse Act of 1988 which prohibited the prescription of steroids for non-therapeutic purposes. This led to WWF owner Vince McMahon Jr., who admitted to being a steroid user himself, being put on trial on charges of steroid distribution in 1994. The trial concluded with McMahon's acquittal. During this time, Graham personally sued Zahorian and the WWF, claiming that they had forced him to take steroids to maintain his position in the company. His lawsuit was unsuccessful, partly because he had been using steroids for a decade preceding his WWF debut. Recalling the lawsuit on a 2003 episode of WWE Confidential, he attributed the litigation to his bitterness and claimed that he was an innovator of steroid use in the organization.

Graham went on a public awareness campaign regarding the dangers of steroids during this time, including an appearance with McMahon on The Phil Donahue Show in 1992. During the Donahue taping, Graham claimed to have witnessed WWF officials sexually abuse children. McMahon claimed the abuse had never taken place, and Graham later admitted that he made up the allegations, hoping to extort "hush money" out of the WWF. In his autobiography, Graham describes making the allegations as being "my most shameful moment, not only in the wrestling profession, but in my life". Graham wrote an apology to McMahon but received no response until his 2002 liver transplant.

Five years after being inducted into the WWE Hall of Fame, Graham was released from his consultancy position in WWE. He sold his Hall of Fame ring on eBay to help pay for medical bills and requested that he be entirely removed from the Hall of Fame after Abdullah the Butcher was inducted, complaining that Abdullah had never wrestled in the promotion.

Graham spoke out against Linda McMahon during her 2010 Senate campaign, claiming that she was distancing herself from the racy programming that she profited from while acting as CEO for WWE. Upon learning that his liver condition had worsened, Graham reached out to apologize to the McMahons, even offering to be a spokesman for Linda McMahon's campaign.

In July 2015, Graham sent a letter to Vince McMahon requesting to take the position of Dusty Rhodes, who had recently died, at NXT. Graham received criticism from fans due to his timing and opportunism. He defended himself, calling his critics "evil subhumans", and compared a possible reconciliation with McMahon to that of long-time WWE critic Bruno Sammartino, who reconciled with McMahon and was inducted into the WWE Hall of Fame class of 2013.

== Championships and accomplishments ==
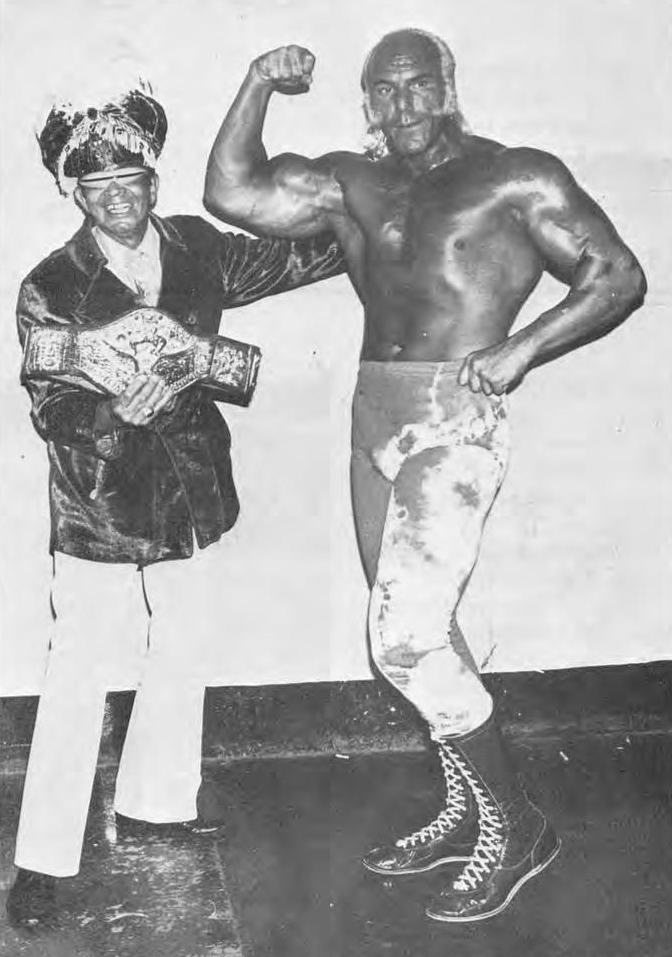
Graham was a one-time WWWF Heavyweight Champion, pictured with The Grand Wizard holding the championship belt.

- 50th State Big Time Wrestling
  - NWA Hawaii Heavyweight Championship (1 time)
- Championship Wrestling from Florida
  - NWA Florida Heavyweight Championship (2 times)
  - NWA Florida Tag Team Championship (1 time) – with Ox Baker
  - NWA Southern Heavyweight Championship (Florida version) (1 time)
- Continental Wrestling Association
  - CWA World Heavyweight Championship (1 time)
- International Pro Wrestling
  - IWA World Heavyweight Championship (1 time)
- NWA Big Time Wrestling
  - NWA Brass Knuckles Championship (Texas version) (4 times)
- NWA San Francisco
  - NWA World Tag Team Championship (San Francisco version) (1 time) – with Pat Patterson
- Pro Wrestling Illustrated
  - Most Hated Wrestler of the Year (1973)
  - Match of the Year (1977) vs. Bruno Sammartino on April 30
  - Match of the Year (1978) vs. Bob Backlund on February 20
  - Ranked No. 277 of the top 500 singles wrestlers of the "PWI Years" in 2003
- Pro Wrestling This Week
  - Wrestler of the Week (June 1–6, 1987)
- Professional Wrestling Hall of Fame and Museum
  - Class of 2009
- World Wide Wrestling Federation/World Wrestling Federation/World Wrestling Entertainment
  - WWWF Heavyweight Championship (1 time)
  - WWE Hall of Fame (Class of 2004)
  - Slammy Award (1 time)
    - Hulk Hogan Real American Award (1987)
- Wrestling Observer Newsletter
  - Most Washed Up Wrestler (1982)
  - Best Pro Wrestling Book (2006) with Keith Greenberg
  - Wrestling Observer Newsletter Hall of Fame (Class of 1996)
