= Carlos Rocha (wrestler) =

Portuguese professional wrestler

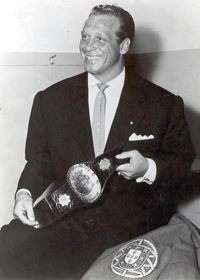

Personal information
- Born: January 11, 1927 Fatima, Portugal
- Died: January 28, 2020 (aged 93) Calgary, Alberta, Canada

Professional wrestling career
- Ring name: Carlos Rocha
- Billed weight: 115 kg (254 lb)
- Debut: 1940
- Retired: 1977

Carlos Rocha was a Portuguese professional wrestler known for being part of the WWWF and for having a career in international wrestling, especially in Canada and the United States.

== Professional wrestling career ==
=== Portugal/Europe/South Africa (1940–1960s) ===
Rocha was born in 1927 and there is scant information about his childhood or place of birth. He joined the Portuguese wrestling scene in the late 1940s, and together with Tarzan Taborda and Zé Luís, participated in wrestling matches at the Parque Mayer and the Coliseu dos Recreios.

Rocha continued his career in Europe, where he wrestled in both Spain and France. In Spain, Rocha was promoted in tag team matches with his fictional brother Jack, and in France he lost to wrestler Arabet Said in 1950. He also traveled to South Africa, where he competed alongside Portuguese wrestler Tarzan Taborda.

=== North America/England/South America (1960s–1970s) ===
In the 1960s, Rocha established himself in the United States, where he competed in wrestling events in California. During this time, he also began traveling around the world. His most notable fight recorded in the 1960s was with Peter Maivia in England.

=== International Wrestling – Montreal (1971–1972) ===
In 1971, Rocha began working for the International Wrestling promotion in Montreal, where he created a small rivalry with a current WWE Hall of Famer, Abdullah The Butcher. This rivalry generated a special event in the Rocha's career, as on December 27, 1971, he defeated Abdullah to become World/International Heavyweight Champion (Montreal version). Shortly after, Rocha left Montreal and worked all over Canada, passing through Vancouver and Stampede Wrestling in Calgary, where he became an acquaintance of Stampede promoter, Stu Hart.

=== Maple Leaf Wrestling – Toronto (1972–1977) ===
Another important stopping point in Carlos Rocha's career was Maple Leaf Wrestling (MPLW). He debuted in the company with a victory over Don Serrano in 1971. Several matches were made during his stay in MPLW, but the ones that caught the most attention were the three consecutive matches against WWE Hall of Famer, The Sheik. These fights broke spectator records, always drawing more than 14,000 people, with their third match drawing 18,700 people.

Rocha's run in MLPW established him as a respected wrestler, and he gained the attention of the World Wide Wrestling Federation (WWWF) owned by Vince McMahon Sr. In 1976, Carlos Rocha became the first Portuguese wrestler to compete in WWWF.

=== World Wide Wrestling Federation (1976–1977) ===
Rocha entered the WWWF (now WWE) in late December 1976 and continued with his “Portuguese Champion” character; the problem, however, was his age. Shortly after joining the promotion he turned 50. He was only in the company for six months, during which time he feuded with Doug Gilbert and the well-known Executioners team (Killer Kowalski and Big John Studd). Individual matches with Gilbert almost always saw Rocha as the winner; however, to defeat the Executioner team, Rocha had to align himself with Andre The Giant.

This all culminated in the highlight of his career, as Rocha challenged Superstar Billy Graham, who was the WWWF Champion at the time, on June 18, 1977, in Providence, Rhode Island. In front of 7,500 people, in a 2 out of 3 falls match, Graham emerged victorious.

His last match in the company was with his first rival there, Doug Gilbert. Following his victory, Rocha left the WWWF and returned to Canada, where he wrestled a few more times for MPLW. Following this run, Rocha disappeared from the world of pro wrestling.

== Death ==
Rocha died at 93 on January 28, 2020.

== Championships and accomplishments ==
- International Wrestling- Montreal
  - World/International Heavyweight Champion (Montreal-Version) (1 time)
