= Ring boy scandal =

1992 sex scandal involving the World Wrestling Federation

The ring boy scandal is a sex scandal in the World Wrestling Federation (WWF; now WWE) centered around allegations that ring announcer Mel Phillips (1941–2012) had recruited teenage boys for the purposes of sexual exploitation during the late 1980s and early 1990s. The scandal, which came at a time of turmoil for the WWF—the promotion was suspected of supplying illegal steroids to their wrestlers at the same time—resulted in the dismissal of Phillips, Terry Garvin and, temporarily, Pat Patterson in 1992.

== Background and initial allegations ==
World Wrestling Entertainment (WWE; known as the World Wrestling Federation, or WWF, prior to 2002) is a professional wrestling promotion based in Stamford, Connecticut; from its foundation in 1953 until its 2023 sale to Endeavor, it was owned and operated by the McMahon family. In 1982, Vince McMahon bought the promotion from his father and underwent an aggressive national expansion which effectively made the WWF the leading promotion in the country, and later, the world.

As was standard within the wrestling industry at the time, the WWF would routinely recruit young men as gofers; in particular, they would be asked to help set up the ring before events. Mel Phillips, who appeared on-screen as a ring announcer, was tasked with managing the ring crew. In 1992, one such "ring boy", Tom Cole, went public with allegations of child sexual abuse against the WWF, which were initially broken in the New York Post by sports journalist Phil Mushnick on February 26, 1992.

Cole initially started working for the WWF in 1983, when he was thirteen years old; he initially worked at house shows in Westchester County, New York, before being hired for events in New York City, and eventually, other major cities along the Northeast Corridor. Cole was a runaway from a single-parent home, and alleged that Phillips would encourage him to recruit other boys from broken homes for ring work. According to a draft legal complaint against the WWF, Phillips engaged in fetishistic play with Cole's feet, such as rubbing them against his genitals, and other boys had similar experiences.

Cole also alleged that Terry Joyal – who wrestled for the WWF under the ring name Terry Garvin and was Phillips' supervisor backstage – had sexually harassed him twice as a teenager. On the first occasion, in 1988, Joyal allegedly solicited Cole on a car trip to Massachusetts and offered him alcohol and drugs; after rebutting Joyal's advances, Cole was not offered further work for some time. On the second occasion, in 1990, Joyal allegedly solicited Cole for oral sex; after Cole rejected his advances again, Phillips rescinded a job offer to Cole, supposedly on Joyal's orders. In a 2020 statement to Business Insider, WWE attorney Jerry McDevitt confirmed the second incident did take place, but denied that it was indicative of a culture of child sexual abuse, as Cole was nineteen years old at the time. Cole also made similar accusations of sexual harassment against Joyal's boss Pat Patterson, another veteran wrestler and a member of McMahon's inner circle.

== The scandal ==
In response to Mushnick's story, the WWF issued a statement that it would "take responsible action regarding any legitimate claims filed through lawful channels"; on March 2, 1992, Phillips, Joyal and Patterson all resigned their roles in the company. At the same time, Mushnick alleged that McMahon had telephoned him and said that Phillips had been initially dismissed in 1988 because he had a "peculiar and unnatural" relationship with the ring boys, had been re-hired several months later if Phillips promised to "steer clear from kids" and that Phillips would not be offered his job back in the light of the scandal.

On March 11, The San Diego Union-Tribune published an article that not only mentioned Cole's allegations, but also summarised the ongoing steroid use scandal and allegations by former WWF wrestler Barry Orton and former announcer Murray Hodgson against Joyal and Patterson. The story also included allegations by another former ring boy, Chris Loss, who alleged "boys [were] getting propositioned and played with all the time", but that ring boys "put up with it" because the WWF generously paid them.

On March 13, Cole's attorney, Alan Fuchsberg, sent a draft copy of a legal complaint to the WWF, seeking $3.5 million in restitution. Two days later, Cole and Fuchsberg met with Vince McMahon, his wife Linda and WWF's counsel Jerry McDevitt at Fuchsberg's offices in Manhattan. According to Cole in a 1999 interview, he initially offered to settle for approximately $750,000 but eventually acquiesced to a settlement that would see him re-hired by the WWF with backpay.

One day later, McMahon appeared for a taping of The Phil Donahue Show, with Hodgson, Orton, former WWF wrestlers Bruno Sammartino and "Superstar" Billy Graham, and wrestling journalist Dave Meltzer also appearing on the panel. According to Cole, the McMahons engineered his appearance so the settlement could be announced, but were unable to do so as host Phil Donahue did not mention Cole by name. During the show, Sammartino and Graham recalled an incident in the late 1970s or early 1980s where a member of the ring crew was caught molesting a boy in the parking lot before a show in Pennsylvania, but faced no disciplinary action. Graham also stated that he had witnessed Patterson assaulting a child at a WWF event; he later admitted to making up this claim in an attempt to extort hush money out of the company.

In the following week's issue of the Wrestling Observer Newsletter, Meltzer recounted his appearance on the show – including a supposed confrontation between Cole and Sammartino and Graham after the taping – and corroborated other aspects of Mushnick's reporting of the scandal. Meltzer also stated that the rumours of Joyal's and Phillips' activities dated back to at least the mid-1980s.

== Aftermath ==
Despite Cole withdrawing his complaints, 1992 continued to be a year of turmoil for the WWF. The scandal broke in the run-up to both the debut of McMahon's new World Bodybuilding Federation (WBF) on television on April 4 and WrestleMania VIII on April 5. On April 2, the U.S. Department of Justice formally subpoenaed the WWF in regards to the steroid scandal, and on April 3, former WWF referee Rita Chatterton appeared on Geraldo Rivera's talk show Now It Can Be Told and alleged that McMahon had raped her in 1986. Later in that year, McMahon separately sued Chatterton and Mushnick for defamation; the lawsuits would end inconclusively. The WBF folded in July 1992, McMahon was indicted, prosecuted, and eventually acquitted of illegally supplying steroids to WWF wrestlers over the next two years and WWF's business would decline during the mid-1990s as they struggled to replace their most popular star, Hulk Hogan, who had also been implicated in the steroid scandal.

Joyal's and Phillips' careers ended after the scandal, but Patterson was offered his job back after Hodgson retracted his allegations, and stayed with WWE for most of the rest of his life until his death from cancer in 2020. The FBI investigated Phillips and identified ten potential victims, but did not press charges as none of them were willing to testify as to the nature of his activities. Cole was fired in 1993 after failing conditions related to his re-employment. In that same year, he filed a lawsuit against the WWF, Joyal, Patterson and Phillips; the lawsuit was dismissed a year later. Phillips and the WWF would be sued by a third ring boy in 1999; that case was eventually settled a year later. Phillips died in 2012 after two decades away from public life. Cole died by suicide in 2021, at the age of 50.

Linda McMahon served as WWE president and CEO from 1993 until her resignation from the company in 2009 in order to campaign to become the U.S. Senator for Connecticut in the 2010 elections. When reached for comment by Politico in 2010, Cole approvingly spoke of her role in his situation and endorsed her campaign. McMahon was unsuccessful in both the 2010 and 2012 elections. She was later nominated by Donald Trump – a life-long friend to the McMahon family – to lead the Small Business Administration, a role she held between February 2017 and April 2019. During the vetting process, Trump's transition team highlighted "WWE's alleged culture of sexual abuse" – including the ring boy scandal – as a possible red flag, but the issue was not raised during her confirmation hearings. Linda's role in the scandal and the pending lawsuit was brought up during Senate hearings to confirm her as Secretary of Education in February 2025, but did not prevent her eventual confirmation.

Vince McMahon was eventually ousted as CEO of WWE in 2022 after the company's board of directors found that he had made hush money payments totalling US$12 million to several women who alleged sexual misconduct against him. McMahon would temporarily return in January 2023 to oversee the company's sale to Endeavor, but was ousted yet again in January 2024 after one of the women concerned, Janel Grant, alleged that he had raped and trafficked her.

The ring boy scandal received renewed attention after the release of the 2024 Netflix documentary miniseries Mr. McMahon, which covered the 1992 scandals in its second episode. After the series aired, five John Does in Maryland – where the Maryland Child Victims Act removed the statute of limitations for historical child sexual abuse cases – collectively sued WWE, its parent company TKO Group Holdings and both Linda and Vince McMahon for negligence, alleging that Phillips assaulted and groomed them at various points during the 1980s; and that the McMahons "knew or should have known" about Phillips' actions, but instead "knowingly fostered and allowed a culture of sexual misconduct to permeate the WWE". In December 2024, the case was stayed pending a challenge to the law's constitutionality; in February 2025, the Supreme Court of Maryland ruled that the law was constitutional, which would allow the lawsuit to proceed. In April 2025, three more Does joined the lawsuit, which included new allegations of sexual abuse by Phillips and Patterson, as well as an allegation that, on one occasion, Patterson was assisted by then-wrestler Koko B. Ware. In December 2025, the judge presiding over the case fully dismissed one of the ring boys' claims, but allowed seven of the Does to continue their claims against TKO, WWE and Vince McMahon, and two of the Does to continue their claims against Linda McMahon.

== See also ==
- Ashley Massaro, a former WWE wrestler who alleged that the company covered up her rape
- Speaking Out movement, a social movement against sexual abuse in the professional wrestling industry
