= Linda McMahon 2010 United States Senate campaign =

Unsuccessful American political candidacy

Linda McMahon for Senate 2010
- Campaign: U.S. Senator from Connecticut
- Candidate: Linda McMahon
- Affiliation: Republican Party
- Status: Lost
- Headquarters: West Hartford, Connecticut, U.S.
- Key people: Ed Patru (spokesman)
- Receipts: US$50,285,122
- Slogan(s): A businesswoman, not a politician, for Connecticut

Linda McMahon, formerly CEO of World Wrestling Entertainment, ran for U.S. Senator from Connecticut from September 16, 2009, to November 4, 2010. On May 21, 2010, she won a majority of support from the Connecticut Republican Party. She ran as a Republican, promising lower taxes, fiscal conservatism, and job creation. McMahon spent $50 million of her own money on the campaign, allowing her to refuse campaign donations from special interest groups. She gained name recognition and popularity over her Republican opponents, including Rob Simmons, the prior frontrunner.

Simmons, who forced an August primary election, had suspended his campaign shortly after the State Republican convention, but resumed campaigning in late July, participating in debates, and advertising on television. Peter Schiff gained placement on the primary ballot by collecting signatures. McMahon won the August 10 primary, but lost the general election to Richard Blumenthal, then Attorney General of Connecticut, her Democratic opponent.

== Background ==
In August 2009, McMahon's spokesperson said that she had considered running as a Republican candidate in the Connecticut Senate race for the seat then held by Democrat Christopher Dodd. McMahon announced her candidacy on the morning of September 16, 2009. Her husband assumed her duties as CEO at WWE effective immediately. Wrestling fans and political observers initially were incredulous, some thinking the announcement was an "on-screen publicity stunt". As McMahon began airing television and radio advertisements touting her business credentials, it became clear that the campaign was a serious effort.

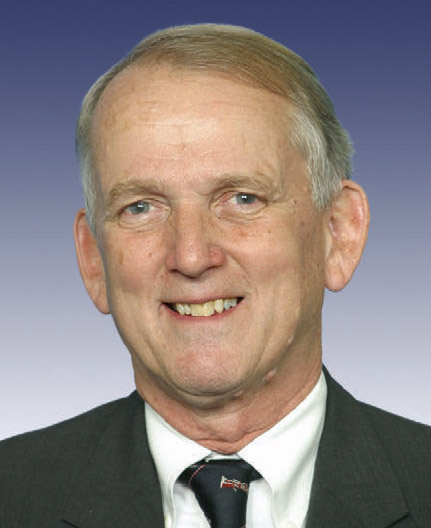
Before McMahon entered the Senate race, Rob Simmons was the Republican frontrunner.

McMahon began her campaign encouraged by news of slumping approval ratings for Dodd. Her Republican opponents had directly attacked him, leveraging popular sentiment against his "insider status" and "fiscal irresponsibility". Connecticut voters stated that the economy and healthcare were their most pressing issues. A November poll showed Rob Simmons as the favorite in the Republican field with a 30–40-point lead over other candidates.

== Campaign for the nomination ==
=== 2009 ===
Linda McMahon ran a media campaign, launching statewide ads on radio, newspapers, mailing brochures, and Web ads targeting Connecticut voters.

McMahon opened her campaign with a media blitz. She advertised on television across the state. McMahon also hired high-profile campaign staff. Her campaign spokesman, Ed Patru, had worked on John McCain's 2000 presidential campaign. Her campaign manager, former State Senator David Cappiello, received a salary of roughly $280,000.

McMahon ran as an outsider, criticizing the Senate for its connection to Wall Street and federal banking bailouts. Her campaign ads emphasized her distance from politics, stressing she was "not a career politician". She criticized the current Senate for passing large bills in a perfunctory manner, particularly the $800 billion stimulus package. Her first televised political ad, "Perseverance", touted her experience as a business leader, stating, "Thirty years ago, my husband and I started our business. It wasn't always easy but we grew it into a publicly traded company that's creating jobs here in Connecticut today."

==== YouTube incident ====
In October 2009, Democratic political operatives used YouTube videos of WWE for political ads. On October 16, Colleen Flanagan, a spokeswoman for Chris Dodd, posted controversial videos that showed the unsavory side of WWE on Talking Points Memo, a political news website. She said the programming showed "simulated rape, public sex and necrophilia" and McMahon should not be Senator because she "condones this type of behavior". Hours later, YouTube removed the videos after contact from WWE. WWE had informed YouTube that the material was copyright under US law.

The Connecticut Democratic Party filed a complaint with the Federal Election Commission asking for an investigation into what happened with the controversial videos. The complaint claimed that of the "almost 500,000" videos of WWE on YouTube, the three were removed selectively to help McMahon's campaign.

==== Republican outsider ====
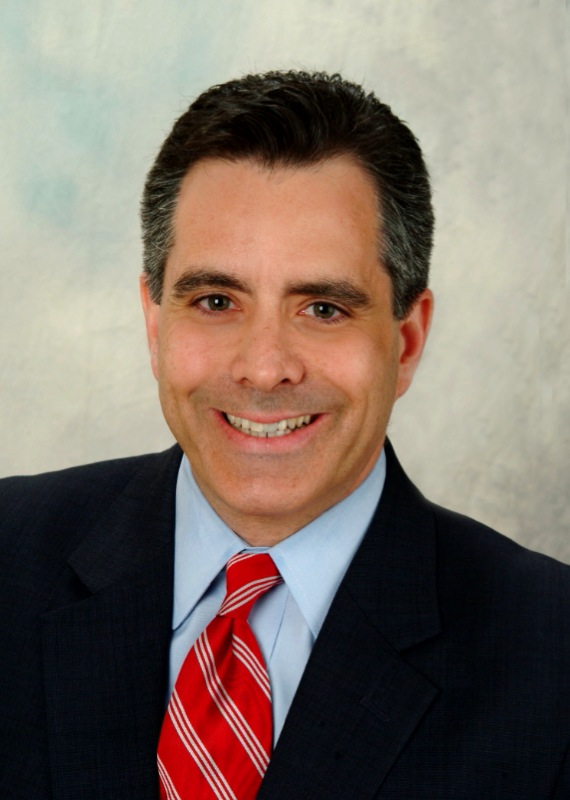
Sam Caligiuri dropped out of the U.S. Senate race in November 2009, leaving an intense rivalry between Simmons and McMahon.

In October 2009, McMahon was viewed as a political outsider in the Republican Party (GOP). She faced competition from Sam Caligiuri and Rob Simmons, both established politicians among Connecticut Republicans. She lost some credibility among Republicans because of revelations about her voting record (Note: McMahon admitted to not voting in 2006 and in the 2008 Republican primaries, saying she decided not to after it became clear that John McCain was the presumptive Presidential nominee. Because of faulty record-keeping at the Republican Registrar of voters in Greenwich, it was originally thought that she had only voted in 2000 and 2008. The claim—which had been published in the Associated Press—was debunked in January 2010 when the Registrar of votes in Greenwich admitted it had poor records, and had recently conducted a new search query. According to its investigation, McMahon had voted in the 2000, 2002, 2004, 2008, and 2009 elections.: See: " McMahon Acknowledges Spotty Voting Record." Congress Daily. p. 20. Retrieved January 25, 2010. See: Summers, April. (September 23, 2009); See: Haigh, Susan. (2009-09-23) "Ex-wrestling CEO running for Senate missed voting." Associated Press Online. Retrieved 2010-01-25.; See "Five Hats Thrown into Republican Ring". Hartford Courant. September 27, 2009. Archived from the original on September 30, 2009.; See: (2010-01-19) Neil, Vigdor. "All eyes on McMahon's voting record in Greenwich." Connecticut Post. Retrieved 2010-01-23.; See: Linda McMahon: "I didn't vote, I regret it, I apologize, and I don't make any excuses for it" KocoSports. Retrieved 2010-03-28.) and past donations to Democrats, prompting speculation that she would run as an Independent candidate should she lose the Republican Primary.

As CEO of World Wrestling Entertainment, McMahon donated to Republicans and Democratic Leadership Council–affiliated Democrats, including Sen. Joe Lieberman in 2006 and Rahm Emanuel from the period of 2002 to 2008. McMahon donated $10,000 to the Democratic Congressional Campaign Committee on September 26, 2006, a contribution that helped Joe Courtney weeks before his win against Rob Simmons for the Second Congressional District. Since 1980, McMahon contributed twice as much to Republicans as to Democrats—($70,700 to Republicans, $35,100 to Democrats, and $1,000 to independents). McMahon also donated to the Republican Majority for Choice in 2006, a political action committee favoring abortion and the "big tent" political strategy of the GOP. This record led conservative activists to label McMahon a RINO.

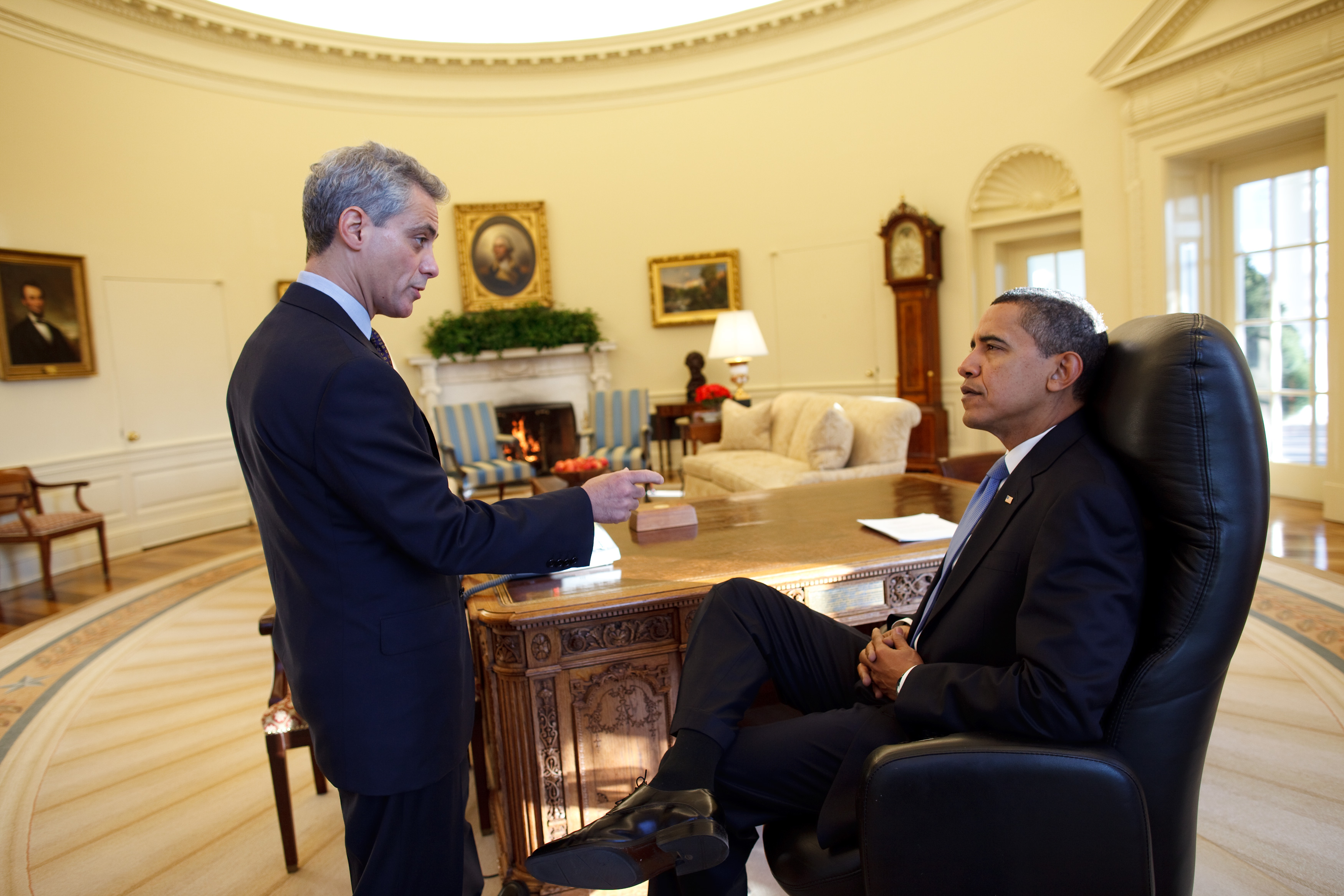
McMahon made several political donations to Rahm Emanuel, Barack Obama's chief-of-staff, between 2002 and 2008.

Connecticut Republican voters were displeased to learn of McMahon's donations to Emanuel, a highly partisan figure who helped orchestrate the Democratic shift in the House in 2006 and Barack Obama's presidential win. McMahon explained to voters that her donations to Emanuel were on behalf of Rahm's brother, Ari Emanuel, who had represented WWE in Hollywood since 1992. According to McMahon, in 2002, "He (Ari) called me one day and he said, my brother is running for Congress in Illinois. It happened to be Rahm. I didn't know Rahm." McMahon made more donations over the course of the next several years, including one check she wrote when Rahm Emanuel came to WWE headquarters to meet her. McMahon's spokesperson clarified that McMahon did not know who Rahm Emanuel was in 2002, but was aware of his partisan status in 2006.

==== Wrestling in the spotlight ====
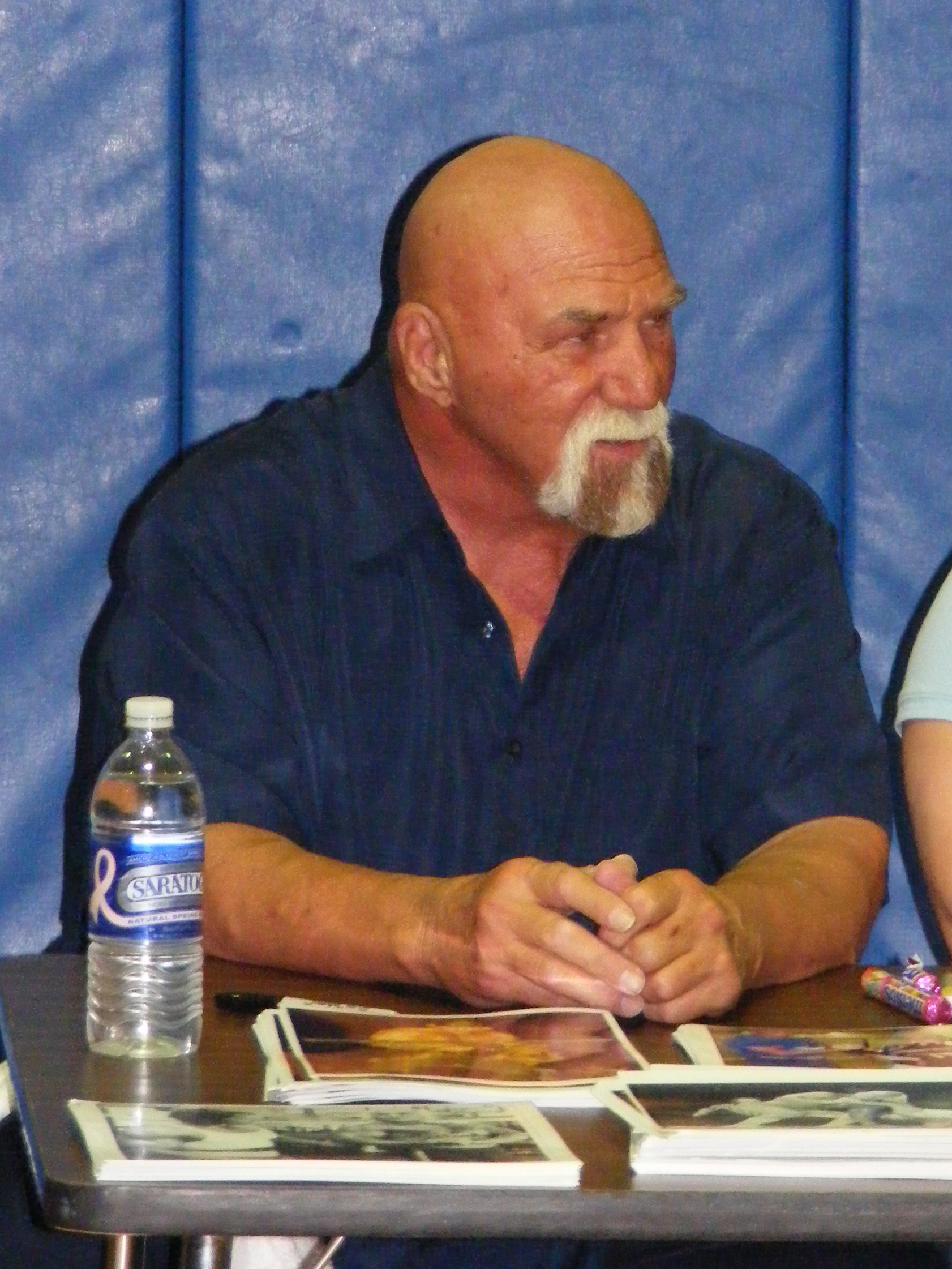
Billy Graham, a former wrestler, was an outspoken critic of McMahon's campaign.

In November 2009, former wrestler Superstar Billy Graham became an outspoken critic of McMahon's campaign. He said the McMahons were hypocrites for "toning down" the violence and sexuality in pro wrestling after many years of showing adult themes. He launched Internet videos on WrestleView saying the WWE's switch to PG was politically motivated: "...they (Linda and Vince) are doing it strictly to get Linda McMahon elected to Senator of Connecticut", he stated in one video. Billy Graham contracted hepatitis C from another wrestler's blood during his time in WWE and required a life-saving liver transplant as a result. When speaking about Linda, he said, "She may look like a Sunday school teacher. Linda McMahon's hands are as bloody as her husband's because she is aware of every move in the ring. She has had no problem with grown men—myself included—cutting their head with a razor blade. All of a sudden, why aren't these guys bleeding anymore? Because Linda is running for the Senate." Graham told reporters that he was furious about having no pension and no health care after his wrestling career with WWE.

McMahon's campaign responded directly to Graham's accusations, saying he was a "self-confessed liar". On November 12, The campaign sent a letter directly to WrestleView, where Billy Graham had posted videos, attacking his credibility. The campaign circulated an apology letter Graham had written to the company in 1996, saying "he has a habit of making false statements when he's not on WWE's payroll". In the letter, Graham had admitted to making unjustified verbal attacks following his termination in 1989. Graham later reached out to apologize to McMahon for his comments, even offering to be a representative for her campaign.

==== McMahon–Simmons rivalry ====
McMahon and Simmons engaged in negative campaigning in November 2009. In one political mailing, McMahon portrayed Simmons to the Tea Party movement as a fraud. (Simmons had courted Tea Party conservatives, and even carried a tea bag in his pocket). In December, an article in The Washington Times suggested that Simmons' appeals to conservatives were insincere, pointing to his past support for "cap and trade" and "card check", two hot button issues for the Tea Party. McMahon's campaign savaged this apparent flip-flop, sending mailings to Connecticut voters highlighting the issue. This hurt Simmons' standing among conservatives and labor unions.

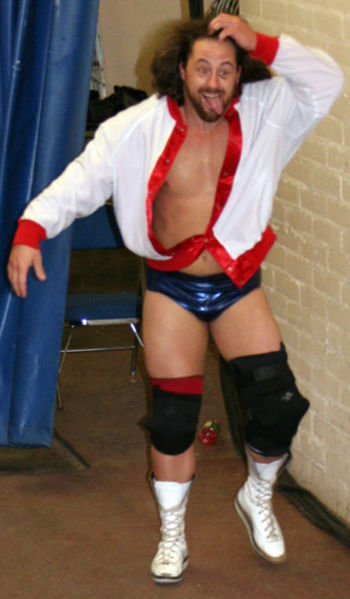
Rob Simmons circulated YouTube videos of Eugene, a mentally challenged wrestler, in his negative campaigning against McMahon.

Simmons focused later advertising on criticizing McMahon and the WWE. Many times, Simmons accused McMahon of trying to "buy the election". In January, he circulated YouTube videos of wrestler Eugene being humiliated on-screen, claiming the WWE was insensitive to the mentally challenged. The McMahon campaign countered, saying Eugene, rather than being ridiculed, was an inspirational character who ultimately became "a hero".

Simmons launched negative ads attacking WWE's history of steroid abuse, its record of premature wrestler deaths, and circulated some of WWE's most politically incorrect segments. By March 2010, the Simmons campaign had gone so negative that some established Connecticut Republicans began to denounce his attacks.

=== 2010 ===
==== Blumenthal replaces Dodd ====
On January 7, just hours after Chris Dodd announced his retirement, the Connecticut Democratic Party launched Richard Blumenthal, the Attorney General, as its new candidate. Blumenthal, who had a job approval rating over 80%, enjoyed near-unanimous support from Democrats and was considered a formidable opponent for any statewide office.

Although Connecticut is considered a solid Democratic-voting state, McMahon and Simmons sought to capitalize on the anti-establishment and anti-Democratic tide that had become a factor in the 2010 campaign season. In particular, Scott Brown's win in Massachusetts was seen as a good omen for Republicans nationally, as it showed that a Republican could win in a "deep blue" state. A key factor in Brown's win had been his demand for fiscal responsibility, which McMahon made her centerpiece issue, attacking Simmons for his voting record as U.S. Representative. In new mailings, she pointed to Simmons' D-rating from the National Taxpayers Union.

In March 2010, while Blumenthal continued to lead all Republican contenders by 20–30 points, McMahon took frontrunner status from Simmons. Her rise in the polls was attributed largely to her heavy media presence, as a polling researcher pointed out, "You can't miss her television ads. They're everywhere. She's the only candidate for Senate that's on TV right now." Political research showed that McMahon had gained strong popularity with female voters, social conservatives, and residents in Fairfield County.

==== April controversies ====
In articles published by the New London Day and Politico.com, McMahon's controversial "tip-off" memo resurfaced, raising new questions regarding her ethical judgment. The 1989 memo asked a WWE executive to "clue in" a company doctor to possible legal action he might face from the Federal government. At the time, the FBI was investigating the doctor for selling steroids to WWF wrestlers, including Vince McMahon which led to a court case where Vince was found not guilty.

The timing of her memo was suspicious, as the investigation did not become public knowledge until May 27, 1990, the day of the doctor's arrest. When the articles were published, Linda did not respond, but WWE did, telling reporters that McMahon only wanted the doctor "clued in" so he would know why he was fired. WWE said McMahon learned of the investigation through a company lawyer who had heard the Federal prosecutor involved, James West, carelessly talking about the case at a fundraising event. West said the WWE's story was a lie, denying ever discussing the case or attending the event in question. Although West and WWE continued to point fingers, McMahon and her campaign did not publicly discuss the story and its ongoing controversy. The news hurt McMahon's public image and, according to her critics, it provided evidence she had tried to "undermine a criminal investigation."

An article published in the Stamford Advocate raised attention to McMahon's voter registration drive at the University of Connecticut, where college students were to be paid a $5 bonus for each voter they registered as a Republican. The potential moral hazard in such a program created negative associations to ACORN's 2008 controversy regarding invalid voter applications. Although the practice was not illegal, the bonus structure was removed from the drive.

==== The New York Times Vietnam story ====
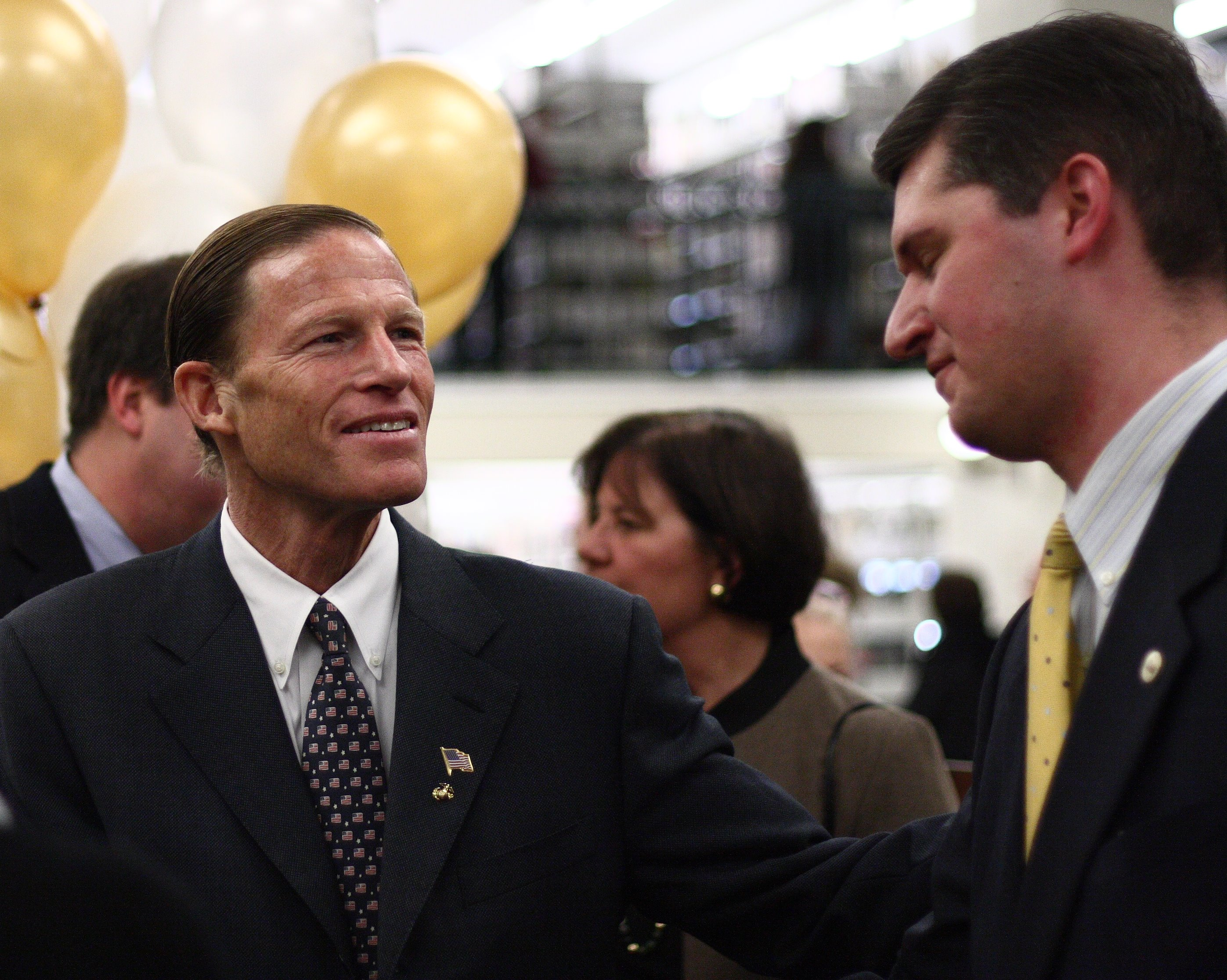
Richard Blumenthal, left, was the Democratic nominee for the U.S. Senate. During her campaign, McMahon capitalized on faulty statements he made about his Vietnam service.

McMahon focused her attention towards the presumptive Democratic challenger in the few weeks before the convention. On May 12, she launched political TV ads on Blumenthal's apparent flip-flop on PAC contributions. On May 17, a story in The New York Times revealed that Blumenthal had made false claims about his military service during the War in Vietnam.

On May 19, McMahon said that she played a role in The New York Times story and confirmed that her campaign helped uncover the facts. Her campaign sent a video of Blumenthal's questionable speech to the newspaper. Days later, McMahon's campaign posted a full version of that speech on YouTube, which showed Blumenthal clearly explaining his "Vietnam era" service early in his speech, clearing the discrepancy. The full version was a godsend for the Blumenthal campaign, and it softened the blow dealt by his later "in Vietnam" gaffe.

McMahon's campaign spokesman, Ed Patru, later told reporters that the campaign strategically "put its fingerprints" on the story to impress Republican delegates before the convention.

==== Republican convention ====
McMahon, Schiff, and Simmons competed for the nomination at the convention on May 21, 2010. Prior to the Convention, McMahon had urged supporters to register for the Republican primary, suggesting that she would run even if she had not won the Republican nomination. Schiff similarly had indicated that he would run regardless of the convention's results.

Simmons, the ostensible Party favorite, staked his campaign on the convention and said repeatedly he would not "force a primary" if he lost the convention. However, when Simmons lost many of his pledged delegates to McMahon, his viability was doubted by the media and state GOP. Pundits revealed that Simmons was under pressure to drop out and run for his former Congressional seat. When Simmons was asked about the possibility, he did not explicitly "rule out" a change in races. Simmons was visibly frustrated by the negative media publicity he received as a result. Simmons then claimed that he had more delegates than McMahon by a wide margin. McMahon heavily outspent Simmons, maintaining a steady lead over both her rivals. Simmons could not fund TV ads after a drop in fundraising. In the weeks prior to the convention, Simmons failed to regain in the polls.

State Republican Convention results (first round)
Party	Candidate	Votes	%
Republican	Linda McMahon*	737	51.76
Republican	Rob Simmons*	632	44.62
Republican	Peter Schiff	44	3.11
Republican	Vincent Forras	7	0.49
Republican	Ethan Book	0	0.00
Total votes		1,414	100.00

* Denotes candidate met the minimum threshold of 15 percent to appear on the primary ballot

* 708 delegates were required to win endorsement from the Republican Party

Schiff was polling at roughly 10% days before the convention and told many of his pledged delegates at the convention to switch to Simmons "because I didn't think McMahon was playing fair." Schiff told his supporters that McMahon's campaign had about 40 members on the convention floor attempting to garner more support while votes were being cast, breaking convention rules.

Simmons was deeply disappointed to lose on the first round of voting. Despite his promise to the contrary, Simmons then decided to force a primary with McMahon. Four days later, on May 25, Simmons reversed himself again, and suspended his campaign, saying he could not compete financially with McMahon's deep pockets. Although Simmons was no longer campaigning, he often disparaged McMahon to the press. He told The National Review that he did not think McMahon "can win at all". He also said that if she were to ask for his help, he would say he was "preoccupied". Simmons said he did McMahon a favor by stopping his campaign, but he did not endorse her. He said he would not call off the August primary because "voters deserve another choice." Many of Simmons' hardcore backers also refused to back McMahon.

In late July, Simmons re-entered the race by airing ads on TV reminding Republican primary goers that he was still on the ballot, as well as by participating in debates and editorial board discussions.

==== Republican primary ====
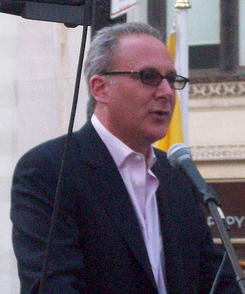
Peter Schiff, who failed to gain 15% of Republican support at the Republican Convention, collected petitions to challenge her in an August Primary.

In the weeks after her victory at the Republican Convention, McMahon fared poorly in political polls and suffered from high unfavorability ratings among both Democrats and Republicans. The Cook Political Report attributed much of the damage in her public image to months of criticism from Simmons and the media. On June 8, McMahon released her own internal polling to assure Republicans she was competitive with Blumenthal.

Nonetheless, negative sentiment towards McMahon fueled some momentum for both Simmons and Schiff. Some Republican voters who had supported Simmons turned to Schiff, who shared their resentment towards McMahon and the convention. Schiff fared poorly in the convention, but collected over 10,000 signatures from Connecticut residents was placing him on the primary ballot.

Mothers Opposing McMahon, a 527 group, was established in July 2010.

McMahon spent the remainder of June and July attempting to control the wrestling element of her public image, which repeatedly received negative media attention. On June 22, McMahon's campaign gained unwanted attention from a lawsuit filed by Martha Hart, the wife of deceased wrestler Owen Hart, in regard to a wrestling DVD featuring her husband. The WWE said her lawsuit was "meritless", nothing more than a "political hit job." McMahon launched TV ads embracing her career in WWE, downplaying negative opinion of wrestling as a form of "soap opera" entertainment. In July 2010, five women from West Hartford attacked her wrestling career, saying WWE encouraged profane and violent treatment of women. The McMahon campaign dismissed their group, Mothers Opposing McMahon, as a group of Democratic operatives, arguing that their press conference was organized and paid for by the Connecticut Democratic Party. Nonetheless, McMahon's campaign continued to fend off attacks, such as the Tom Cole affair and when she pretended to kick Jim Ross before firing him as part of a WWE storyline.

===== Primary results =====
McMahon won the Republican nomination on August 10 with 49% of the vote. Her win received a great deal of national attention, plenty of media coverage, and congratulatory calls from national Republicans Mitt Romney and John Cornyn. McMahon also received calls from Schiff and Simmons offering their support. McMahon's lack of a majority was derided by critics as a sign that Republicans were not fully satisfied with her candidacy. Simmons said it was possible that Schiff was a spoiler in the campaign, siphoning off support that could have helped him defeat McMahon.

== General election ==
During the general election, McMahon campaigned in small towns and appeared with local Republicans, positioning herself as a populist candidate against "establishment" figure Blumenthal.

=== Lance Cade's death ===
In August 2010, former WWE wrestler Lance Cade died from heart failure at the age of 29, renewing controversy over WWE. Cade had abused painkillers and steroids during his career in WWE. When a reporter asked her about Cade, McMahon replied the WWE had no more ability to prevent his death "than a studio could have prevented Heath Ledger's death". She also told the Connecticut Post "I may have met him once". Cade's father disputed McMahon's assertion of so distant a connection, and her remarks prompted former WWE wrestler Christopher Nowinski to speak out against McMahon and the WWE. He alleged that the abuse of steroids and painkillers was encouraged and rewarded by the company, saying McMahon was "just kicking dirt on the guy's grave." He also related a conversation he had with Cade in which Cade expressed a desire to stop using steroids, but said, "the pressure is to use them, because the WWE rewards the guys who use them."

WWE quickly responded to Nowinski's accusations, saying, "It is very dubious that he ever had a conversation with Lance Cade much less Lance Cade confiding to a total stranger that he used painkillers and steroids." The company also sought to discredit Nowinski by claiming that he had failed to disclose that he had suffered previous concussions before signing his contract with WWE, as was required. They further disputed his claims as to the number of days wrestlers worked, on average, and observed that despite Nowinski's renown in the area of CTE, a form of brain injury resulting from repeated concussions, he is not an expert in matters relating to steroids or pain killers. The charge that Nowinski was a "stranger" to Cade was refuted by Nowinski: He and Lance Cade had been tag team partners during 2002–2003, and co-workers until 2007.

=== Attacks on Blumenthal's credibility ===
I've never taken PAC money, and I have rejected all special interest money because I have stood strong and taken legal action against many of those special interests

— Richard Blumenthal

In August 2010, McMahon damaged Blumenthal's credibility by publicizing an apparent flip-flop he made on PAC donations. She used both TV ads and mailers to portray him as "dishonest" for accepting over $480,000 in PAC money in 2010, following $17,000 during the 1980s.

In October, McMahon aired TV ads comparing Blumenthal to departing Senator Chris Dodd and the corruption of the Countrywide scandal. During a debate on October 7, McMahon criticized his vote as a state Senator in 1989 for a $850 million tax increase. Blumenthal fired back, referencing her memo to Pat Patterson, saying that while he was a state Senator in 1989, "she was tipping off the doctor who worked for her about a federal investigation, a criminal investigation."

=== Scott Brown endorsement ===
On October 9, Linda McMahon received the endorsement of Massachusetts U.S. Senator Scott Brown, a Republican who had been elected to the Senate in a January 2010 special election to the seat long-held by Democrat Ted Kennedy. The rally was held in front of Milford City Hall and was attended by around 250 people. Brown had also faced a Democratic state attorney general in his bid for U.S. Senate, Martha Coakley.

== Political positions ==
McMahon campaigned on a platform of fiscal conservatism, lower taxes, and job creation. She opposed the 2009 stimulus act, saying the money from the stimulus "went into government agencies, not the hands of small businesses that are going to create 70% of jobs." McMahon also denounced deficit spending, expressing support for a Constitutional balanced budget amendment. McMahon blamed Democrats for not reclaiming unspent money from the Troubled Asset Relief Program (TARP) and the bailout package, saying the money should be used to repay government debts. (Note: McMahon gave an interview supporting TARP in its original form, which was to purchase toxic assets in the context of a financial crisis. Nevertheless, she has been a strong opponent of the TARP program throughout the campaign, saying that the government overstepped its authority in purchasing shares of the automobile and banking industries.: See West Hartford interview; See McMahon ad hands Simmons a conservative club, UPDATED December 9, 2009) She also accused the Executive Branch of evading the system of checks and balances through the use of "policy czars" and executive orders.

McMahon attacked the Federal Reserve for "micromanaging" small banks through the stimulus programs and called for an end to bank bailouts. McMahon alleged that the 2008 financial crisis could be attributed in part to the repeal of the Glass–Steagall Act in 1999, and advocated that Congress revisit the issue. She stated that small business creates most new jobs, and that government created many obstacles to economic recovery. She pushed for greater credit availability to help businesses invest.

On April 7, 2010, McMahon's campaign unveiled a jobs plan to "put Connecticut back to work." The plan was modeled on Reaganomics, crediting Dr. John Rutledge, who wrote many of Reagan's policies in 1980–81, as Chief Economic Adviser to the McMahon campaign. Proposals in the plan included:

- lower tax rates for capital gains and dividends
- abolition of the estate tax and the gift tax
- greater tax deductions to encourage savings for IRAs and higher education
- passage of pending free trade agreements with Colombia, Panama, and South Korea
- government deregulation, rejecting cap and trade and card check legislation

McMahon supported offshore drilling. After the BP Oil Spill, a McMahon spokesman said she desired stronger penalties for such incidents, but believed a moratorium on new drilling would devastate economies in Gulf states, and make America "more dependent on foreign oil". She supported expanded drilling, naming the Outer Continental Shelf, ANWR, the Green River Formation, and the Bakken Shale Deposits as attractive sites for energy exploration. McMahon also supported alternative energy, including fuel-cell, solar, wind and geothermal technology.

McMahon claimed to be socially moderate. She was pro-choice, and donated to Republican Majority for Choice. She did not support partial birth abortions and favored parental notification laws. McMahon opposed amnesty for illegal immigrants and supported border security. She supported fixing the visa application process to encourage legal immigration. She generally supported gay rights, including the repeal of Don't Ask, Don't Tell. She personally felt that marriage should be between a man and a woman, but favored state authority on the issue of same-sex marriage. McMahon voiced displeasure with federal statutes on same-sex marriage, such as the Defense of Marriage Act.

On foreign policy, McMahon expressed interest in joining a defense-related committee in the Senate. Concerning the war in Afghanistan, McMahon said she was "apprehensive about the economic repercussions of a protracted war", but said "It is my hope that we bring our troops home safely as soon as possible, but we should bring them home responsibly and in victory, not defeat." During a Republican debate, she took a "hawkish" stance on Iran, saying all options should be on the table, including the military one. She said that the U.S. military should be "second to none", and promised more representation to defense contractors from Connecticut, including Sikorsky.

== Analysis ==
=== Campaign scrutiny ===
The McMahon campaign was criticized for limiting direct access to the candidate. McMahon was accompanied by staff at all public events. She limited her press availability to pre-scheduled interviews, avoiding traditional press conferences and impromptu questions. Staff highly controlled her photo opportunities, Twitter postings, and public events, and often did not notify the press in advance of public appearances.

McMahon did not disclose her positions on Social Security, Medicaid and Medicare in the weeks before the Republican primary, leading to accusations she was avoiding controversial issues. "She claims she wants to cut federal spending, yet refuses to discuss her position on Medicare and Social Security, two of the most costly entitlement programs."

=== McMahon family campaign presence ===
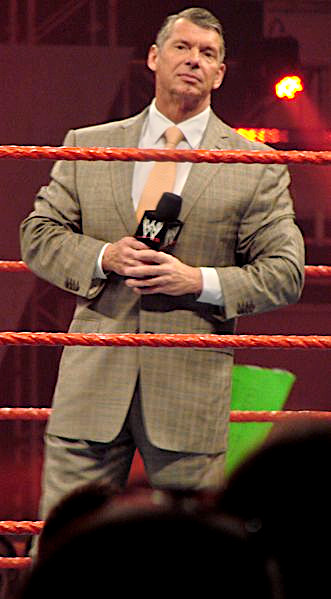
Vince McMahon did not appear on the campaign trail with Linda for much of her campaign.

McMahon's husband, Vince McMahon, did not actively campaign for his spouse, causing speculation that Linda McMahon was distancing herself from him during the early stages of the campaign. In February 2010, Linda said Vince was too busy "running the company" as both chairman and CEO to campaign, but said he may be involved "down the road". Several speculators predicted that if he campaigned with her, his direct association with controversial wrestling skits would be a "major liability".

McMahon's son-in-law, WWE wrestler Triple H, gave an interview to The Wall Street Journal on March 12, 2010, where he said he had purposely kept an "arms length away from Linda" during her campaign to avoid giving her bad publicity. On March 14, 2010, a news story in the Stamford Advocate revealed that her husband, Vince McMahon, owned a 47-foot sports yacht called The Sexy Bitch. Linda's absence from the wrestling industry was also noted on April 20, when an article by the Greenwich Time reported that she was courting voters in Westport, Connecticut, while her husband was running a live wrestling event at the Mohegan Sun Arena.

Vince McMahon appeared together with Linda for the first time on April 21, 2010, at a charity function at Sacred Heart University. At one point during the event, he reportedly grabbed a microphone and said to Richard Blumenthal, "My name is Vince McMahon and my wife is the one who's going to beat you this fall".

==== Vince McMahon's activities ====
Through October and November 2010, Vince McMahon took increasing action to support fans and the company image which he believed was being damaged by Linda's campaign. On several occasions, Connecticut Secretary of State Susan Bysiewicz stated that poll workers had the right to bar voters wearing WWE merchandise to the polls, claiming they were "political items". WWE filed a federal lawsuit against Bysiewicz to prevent this. He also launched a "Stand up for WWE" campaign on the Internet and gave away company T-shirts and merchandise.

On October 30, 2010, WWE held a "Fan Appreciation Day" in Hartford, Connecticut. Vince acknowledged that the event was held to counter the negative publicity from the Senate race. During the wrestling show, McMahon distanced himself from his wife's political campaign, saying, "Some people may think I was going to talk about politics today. Nothing could be further from the truth. I do encourage you to vote this Tuesday, and while you're voting, feel free to wear a WWE T-shirt. I came out here to simply say thank you. That's what this day is all about. It's about fan appreciation. No one appreciates the fans more than World Wrestling Entertainment." The Connecticut Democratic Party filed an FEC complaint against Linda McMahon's campaign in October, claiming the WWE's "Fan Appreciation Day" was an "illegal campaign contribution". The complaint also cited the taping of "Smackdown in Bridgeport Harbor Yard" on Election Day, claiming it intended to suppress voter turnout in a Democratic-leaning community.

=== 2012 candidacy ===
McMahon ran in the United States Senate election in Connecticut, 2012, and lost to Chris Murphy.

== Results ==
United States Senate election in Connecticut, 2010
Party	Candidate	Votes	%	±%
Democratic	Richard Blumenthal	636,040	55.16%	−11.20%
Republican	Linda M. McMahon	498,341	43.22%	+11.08%
Independent	Warren B. Mosler	11,275	0.98%	N/A
Connecticut for Lieberman	Dr. John Mertens	6,735	0.58%	N/A
Write-In	Write-in candidates (8)	724	0.06%	N/A
Majority		137,755	11.95%	
Total votes		1,153,115	100	
Democratic hold				

== See also ==
- United States Senate election in Connecticut, 2010
