= Rita Chatterton =

American professional wrestling referee

Personal information
- Born: Rita Filicoski; January 22, 1957 (age 69) Albany, New York, U.S.

Professional wrestling career
- Ring name: Rita Marie
- Trained by: Tony Altomare
- Debut: 1984
- Retired: 1993

Rita Chatterton (born Rita Filicoski; January 22, 1957) is a retired professional wrestling referee.

Appearing as Rita Marie, she became the first female referee in the World Wrestling Federation (WWF, now WWE) in 1984. Chatterton accused WWF promoter Vince McMahon of raping her in 1986, her final year with the company. She is a charter member of the International Professional Wrestling Hall of Fame and Women's Wrestling Hall of Fame.

== Personal life ==
Chatterton was born in Albany, New York on January 22, 1957, and grew up in the nearby town of Mechanicville. She is divorced and has a daughter. Her brother, Christopher, dreamed of being a wrestler before his death in 1979 and inspired her to become involved with the industry. Complications from a collapsed lung prevented her from becoming a wrestler, so she pursued work as a referee. She was trained by Tony Altomare, and became a licensed referee in the state of New York in 1984.

After retiring from wrestling in 1993, Chatterton relocated to Albany. She spent the next few decades working as a youth counselor. She retired in 2018 due to an injury sustained from slipping on ice.

== Professional wrestling career ==
Billed as Rita Marie, Chatterton became the first female referee to work in the World Wrestling Federation (WWF). Chatterton has stated that WWF executives Pat Patterson and Jay Strongbow tried to stop her from officiating her first match, only permitting it after she threatened to sue them and the WWF. Although she went on to work in a women's tag team match later that night, Chatterton says Patterson encouraged the wrestlers to injure her so that she would not want to work with the promotion again but the wrestlers refused to comply.

After working some smaller jobs for the promotion, she made her television debut at a Madison Square Garden show in January 1985. She would subsequently become a regular feature for the company during its Rock 'n' Wrestling Connection era. During this time, she was featured in WWF Magazine and Cosmopolitan, and was interviewed on Tuesday Night Titans. Chatterton states that she left a job at Frito-Lay during this time due to promises of a lucrative future with the WWF.

Chatterton alleges that WWF promoter Vince McMahon raped her in his limousine in July 1986. An attorney for the promotion stated that she had been "fired for cause" in 1986, while another source states that she resigned from the company that year. As she remained a licensed referee, the New York State Athletic Commission sent her to work some smaller WWF events after 1986 but she declined to work shows where she knew McMahon would attend. She ultimately decided to step away from wrestling after the death of her close friend André the Giant in 1993. The WWF/WWE was later accused of eliminating her from their history, as they promoted Jessika Carr as being their first female referee after her debut in 2017.

After decades away from wrestling, Chatterton began making appearances and doing interviews in the early 2020s, as she was inducted into the International Professional Wrestling Hall of Fame and Women's Wrestling Hall of Fame. Although she ruled out the possibility of ever working for McMahon again, she is open to participating in wrestling again in the future. She serves as a mentor at Leonard Inzitari's wrestling school.

In 2025, Chatterton revealed that she had been signed to All Elite Wrestling (AEW) for a year after being contacted by promoter Tony Khan. However, she stated that she did "absolutely nothing" during her time under contract.

== Vince McMahon sexual assault allegation ==
In 1992, producers working for television personality and journalist Geraldo Rivera reached out to Chatterton regarding the rape allegation against McMahon. She came forward and told her story publicly on two of Rivera's shows: Now It Can Be Told and The Geraldo Rivera Show. According to New York Magazine, her allegations did not get much coverage at the time due to the WWF facing other scandals, including allegations of steroid distribution and child sexual abuse allegations involving other WWF officials. McMahon denied the allegation and, along with his wife, Linda, sued Chatterton, Rivera and Rivera's producers. The lawsuit was abandoned after he was indicted in the steroid case which ended with his acquittal in 1994.

Her allegation resurfaced in June 2022. While her wrestling career was being profiled by Abraham Riesman for New York Magazine, new sexual misconduct allegations from other women were made against McMahon, leading her to speak publicly for the first time since 1992. Wrestler Leonard Inzitari corroborated her story in the piece. That December, Chatterton's legal team sent McMahon a demand letter, seeking $11.75 million in damages. McMahon settled it later that month, with his attorney stating that he maintains his innocence but settled to "avoid the cost of litigation". People familiar with the matter reported that McMahon agreed to a multimillion-dollar settlement.

In February 2024, The Wall Street Journal reported that federal investigators were probing the sexual assault allegations against McMahon and whether payments made to his accusers violated federal law. Chatterton was named in a grand jury subpoena as being one of the women whose claims are being investigated. A year later, it was reported that the investigation had been dropped.

== Awards and accomplishments ==
- International Professional Wrestling Hall of Fame
  - Trailblazer Award (2021)
- Women's Wrestling Hall of Fame
  - Class of 2023
