= Tarzan Taborda =

Former Portuguese wrestler

Personal information
- Born: Albano Taborda Curto Esteves; May 27, 1935 Aldeia do Bispo, Penamacor, Portugal
- Died: September 9, 2005 (aged 70)

Professional wrestling career
- Ring names: Albano Taborda; Juan Perez; King Kong; Mr. Mexico; Tarzan Curtys; Taborda Sputnik; Tarzan Taborda; White Angel

Albano Taborda Curto Esteves (May 27, 1935 – September 9, 2005) was a Portuguese professional wrestler, better known by the ring name Tarzan Taborda.

== Career ==
Born in Aldeia do Bispo, Penamacor, Portugal, Esteves became a professional wrestler after coming second in the Mister Europe bodybuilding competition. He wrestled over 4000 professional wrestling matches (without losing a single one in his native country) from the late 1950s until 1981, earning the nicknames Taborda Sputnik, Tarzan Curtys, White Angel (France), King Kong (Africa), Mr. Mexico, and Juan Perez, among others.

As achievements he was four times European Champion and five times World Champion.WrestlingPortugal He also wrestled in the Middle East, in countries like Iraq, where he performed in Baghdad for Saddam Hussein.

Tarzan Taborda was also a ballet dancer in Le Lido, Paris, and a stuntman, where he worked with Brigitte Bardot, Alain Delon, John Wayne and Robert Mitchum on various movies.

In 1992 he published a book titled "Como prolongar a vida com força saúde e beleza ao alcance de todos com método de cultura física".

Until 1994, he was the World Wrestling Federation's color commentator for their television airings in Portugal.

On September 9, 2005 he died of a myocardial infarction at the age of 70.
