= 2010 United States Senate election in Connecticut =

- November 2, 2010
- Turnout: 45.9% (voting eligible)
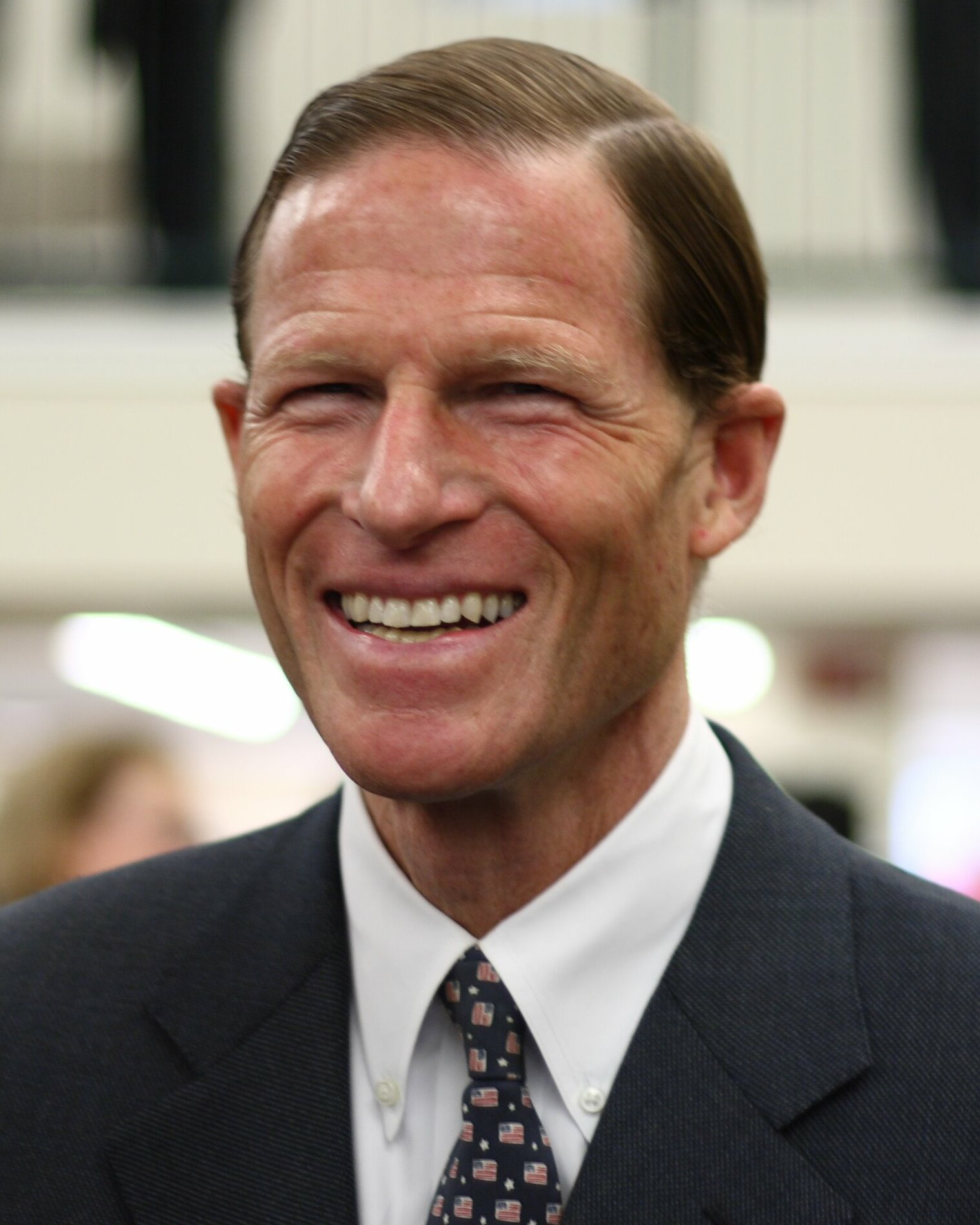

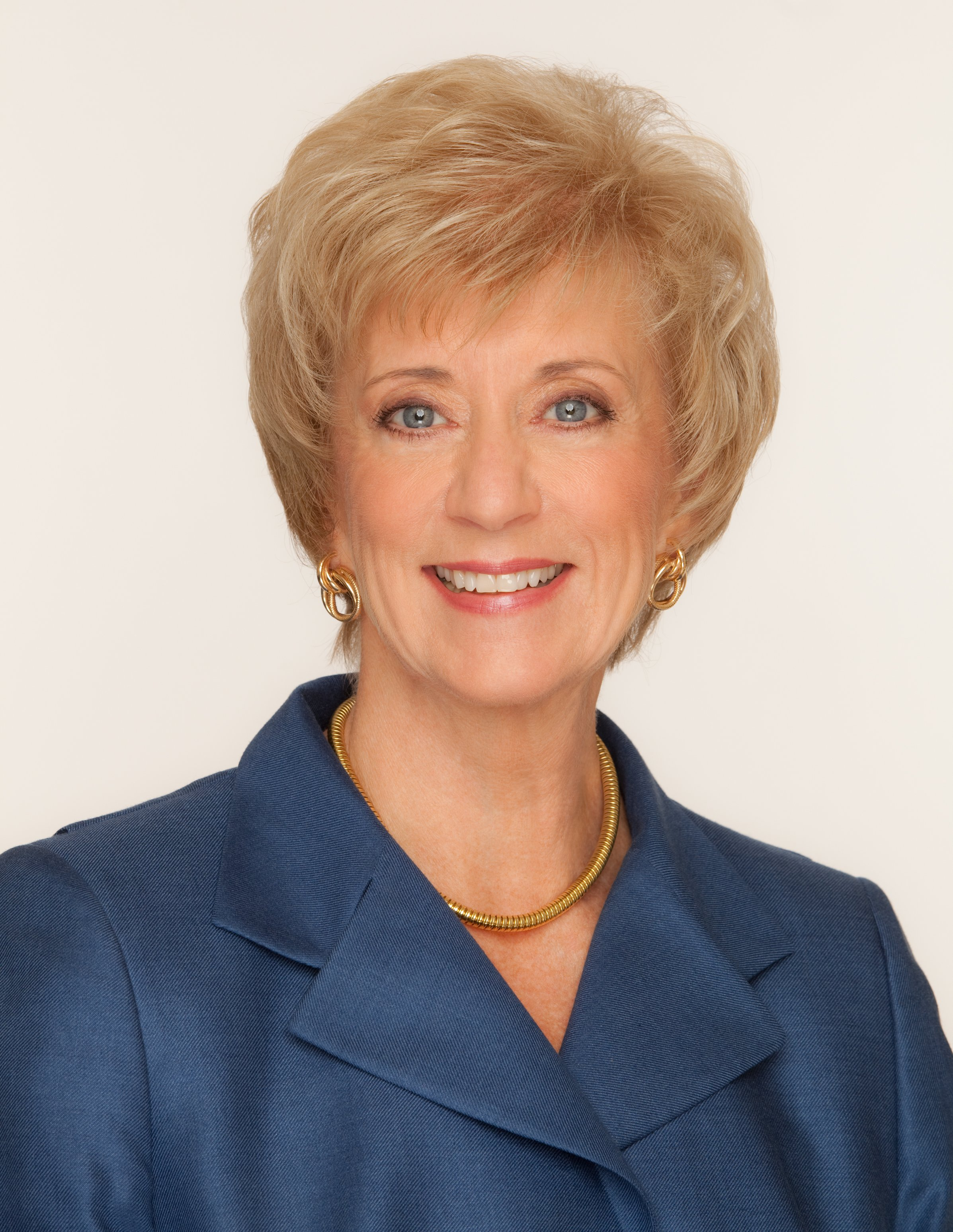
Nominee	Richard Blumenthal	Linda McMahon
Party	Democratic	Republican
Alliance	Working Families
Popular vote	636,040	498,341
Percentage	55.16%	43.22%
- Blumenthal: 40–50% 50–60% 60–70% 70–80% 80–90% McMahon: 40–50% 50–60% 60–70%
U.S. senator before election
Chris Dodd
Democratic
Elected U.S. Senator
Richard Blumenthal
Democratic

The 2010 United States Senate election in Connecticut was a midterm election which took place on November 2, 2010, to decide a Class III Senator from the State of Connecticut to join the 112th United States Congress. Incumbent Democratic U.S. Senator Chris Dodd suffered from dropping approval ratings in the past few years due to major controversies, leading him to announce in January 2010 that he would retire, instead of seeking a sixth term. Richard Blumenthal, incumbent State Attorney General, announced on the same day that he would run for Dodd's seat. The Connecticut Democratic Party nominated Blumenthal on May 21. Businesswoman and future Secretary of Education Linda McMahon won the state party's nominating convention and the August 10 Republican primary to become the Republican candidate. This was the first open Senate seat in Connecticut since 1980, when Dodd was first elected. Blumenthal was the only non-incumbent Democrat to win a non-special election in 2010.

== Background ==
=== Controversies ===
Chris Dodd's power and popularity may have deteriorated for at least three reasons since his last re-election:

1. His poor performance in his bid for the 2008 Democratic presidential nomination appears to have soured local voters. Dodd was criticized for moving to Iowa and neglecting his Senate duties to pursue what many in Connecticut saw as a hopeless campaign. That poll, showing Dodd's job approval at 51% was taken before the scandals.
2. Dodd received mortgage loans as part of the "Friends of Angelo Mozilo" program run by subprime mortgage lender Countrywide Financial. The Hartford Courant reported that Dodd had taken a "major credibility hit" from this scandal. A later poll in September 2008 showed Dodd's job approval declining to 43%, with 46% terming his job performance as "fair" or "poor".
3. On March 18, Dodd admitted responsibility for adding provisions in the 2009 stimulus package that allowed for controversial employee bonuses. He had previously denied responsibility, saying the Administration pushed for the bonus clauses. Dodd only admitted wrongdoing after an unnamed source within the Treasury Department provided insider information to CNN. On March 19, after Dodd came forward, Treasury Secretary Timothy Geithner took full responsibility, saying he pushed Dodd against executive bonus limits.

In December 2008, it was reported that Dodd had a little less than $670,000 banked for a re-election campaign, far less than other senators anticipated to seek re-election. In February 2009, a poll indicated that Dodd's favorability ratings were slipping, and many Connecticut voters were not satisfied with Dodd's explanations regarding the mortgage.

On March 17, 2009, the NRSC released a web ad attacking Dodd for his Irish cottage, his mortgage, and his relocation to Iowa in 2007.

=== Election troubles ===
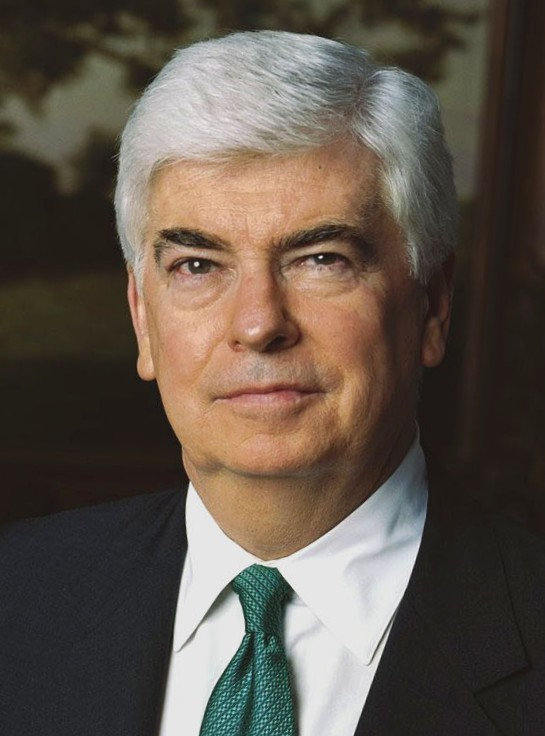
U.S. Senator Chris Dodd

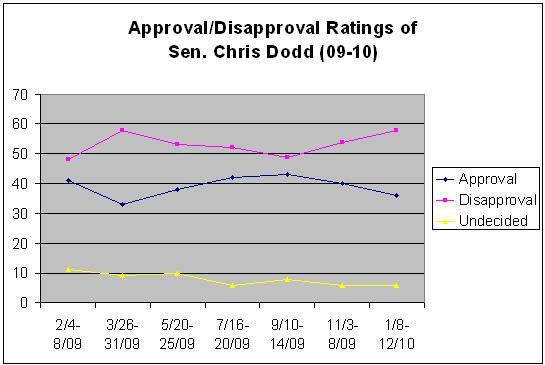
Chris Dodd faced rising Disapproval ratings during his Senate term throughout '09 - '10

On March 2, 2009, noted pundit Michael Barone suggested Dodd was "ripe for the picking" in the 2010 election due to the fallout from his various controversies. Nate Silver of FiveThirtyEight suggested that if necessary, another Connecticut Democrat should primary Dodd. Silver rated Dodd as the single most vulnerable incumbent senator up for re-election in 2010. On December 10, 2009, the Cook Political Report listed this race as "Lean Republican."

Democratic gubernatorial candidate Susan Bysiewicz was quoted suggesting Dodd's yet unannounced re-election bid could be a drag on the candidacies of other Connecticut Democrats in 2010.

Many political leaders speculated Dodd could be persuaded to retire so as to preserve his "senior statesman" legacy. Fellow Connecticut Senator Joe Lieberman had indicated that he would have supported Dodd's reelection, despite past disagreements, including Dodd's 2006 endorsement of Ned Lamont and Lieberman's support of John McCain's 2008 Presidential Campaign.

In fundraising reports issued for the first quarter of 2009, Dodd reported having raised over $1 million, but reported only five contributions from Connecticut residents.

=== Polling ===
A March 2009 Quinnipiac University Polling Institute poll confirmed Dodd's vulnerability. On April 2, 2009, Quinnipiac released a poll indicating Dodd in serious danger of losing re-election, despite the fact that Connecticut is a heavily blue state that President Obama won in 2008 with over 60% of the vote.

He failed to attain a 50% level of support against three lesser known possible Republican opponents. Former U.S. Congressman Rob Simmons (R) in particular was leading in general election polling with double digit margins, and Simmons reached as high as 51% in a GQR poll. Notably, Rasmussen Reports had Simmons 48% to 35% over Dodd in December 2009, a thirteen-point spread.

== Democratic nomination ==
=== Candidates ===
- Richard Blumenthal, state Attorney General
- Merrick Alpert, former aide to David Walters and Al Gore
- Lee Whitnum, businesswoman

Withdrew

- Christopher Dodd, Incumbent U.S. Senator, dropped out and decided to retire

=== Campaign ===
Merrick Alpert announced his candidacy to challenge current Senator Chris Dodd in May 2009. Facing grave prospects at re-election, Dodd announced his retirement from the Senate on January 6, 2010. Richard Blumenthal, the Attorney General and former State Senator announced he would be running.

=== Debate ===
Merrick Alpert and Attorney General Richard Blumenthal squared-off in a March 1 debate highlighting important issues. On healthcare, Alpert revealed his support for a single-payer system. Blumenthal explained that pool-purchasing powers should be explored. Alpert presented information as to how insurance rates had skyrocketed in Connecticut since the Attorney General took office. On the topic of war, Blumenthal pledged his support of President Obama's current plan. Alpert expressed that, being a former peacekeeper in Bosnia, he understood what policies work and which ones do not, elaborating that the current one did not. Alpert set out a plan for the withdrawal of troops from the war in Afghanistan. On a question concerning relations with Cuba, Blumenthal explained that it would take time, and that he would put together a panel of Cuban-American people to decide the best course of action. Alpert explained that he would vote on the issue that night.

=== Polling ===
Poll source	Dates administered	Richard Blumenthal	Merrick Alpert	Lee Whitnum	Undecided
Quinnipiac	January 8–12, 2010	84%	4%	––	12%
Quinnipiac	March 9–15, 2010	81%	6%	––	13%

=== Results ===
Blumenthal won the convention overwhelmingly, disallowing any other candidate to get at least 15% of the vote necessary to get on the primary ballot. Therefore, Blumenthal went uncontested within the Democratic Party and officially became the Democratic nominee.

== Republican nomination ==
=== Candidates ===
- Linda McMahon (campaign) - businesswoman
- Ethan Book, businessman - petitioned for placement in the Republican primary, but fell short.
- Vincent Forras, founder and CEO of Phoenix Group and founder of the 9/11 charity, "Gear-Up, Inc."
- Peter Schiff, securities dealer and investment advisor, economic adviser to Ron Paul's 2008 presidential campaign. Endorsed by the Tea Party.
- Rob Simmons, former U.S. Congressman

=== Campaign ===
On February 27, 2009, Commentary magazine reported that various Washington, D.C. Republicans were seeking to get Larry Kudlow, a popular TV talk show host and columnist, to enter the race against Dodd. State Senator Sam Caligiuri originally planned to run the U.S. Senate, but after doing poorly in both primary and general election polling he decided to drop out and instead run the U.S. House of Representatives in the 5th District. Tom Foley also left the race to run instead for Governor of Connecticut, as incumbent Governor M. Jodi Rell was not seeking re-election.

After the Quinnipiac poll that showed him edging Dodd in a potential matchup, Simmons decided to officially enter the race. Upon his announcement, the DSCC attacked Simmons for his past support of George W. Bush and ties to Jack Abramoff and Tom DeLay. A leading state political blogger, who had endorsed Simmons' opponent in 2006, questioned whether these issues were relevant to the 2010 race. Simmons suspended his campaign after he lost the convention, but did not publicly endorse McMahon. In late July, Simmons revived his effort with a TV ad reminding Connecticut Republicans that "I'm still on the ballot."

McMahon, a billionaire, spent slightly more than $21 million through July 2010. Her two primary opponents each spent slightly more than $2.5 million each. When the Republican primary was held on August 10, frontrunner and party-endorsed candidate McMahon defeated Simmons and Schiff to become the official GOP nominee for the fall election against Richard Blumenthal.

=== Debates ===
On March 2, 2010, Republican candidates Linda McMahon, Rob Simmons, and Peter Schiff participated in the first debate of the GOP campaign on Fox 61.

=== Polling ===
Poll source	Dates administered	Rob Simmons	Linda McMahon	Peter Schiff
Research 2000	September 8–10, 2009	38%	––	1%
Quinnipiac	September 10–14, 2009	43%	––	2%
Quinnipiac	November 3–8, 2009	28%	17%	5%
Moore Information	December 15–16, 2009	35%	37%	4%
Quinnipiac	January 8–12, 2010	37%	27%	4%
Quinnipiac	March 9–15, 2010	34%	44%	9%
Research 2000	May 24–26, 2010	44%	48%	––
Quinnipiac	May 24–25, 2010	23%	49%	11%
Quinnipiac	June 2–8, 2010	29%	45%	13%
Quinnipiac	July 7–13, 2010	25%	52%	13%
Quinnipiac	July 28 – August 2, 2010	30%	47%	14%
Quinnipiac	August 3–8, 2010	28%	50%	15%

=== Results ===
Convention

State Republican Convention results (first round)
Party	Candidate	Votes	%
Republican	Linda McMahon*	737	51.76%
Republican	Rob Simmons*	632	44.62%
Republican	Peter Schiff	44	3.11%
Republican	Vincent Forras	7	0.49%
Republican	Ethan Book	0	0.00%
Total votes		1,414	100.00%

* Denotes candidate met the minimum threshold of 15 percent to appear on the primary ballot

Primary

Results by county McMahon—50–60% McMahon—40–50% Simmons—40–50% Simmons—60–70%

Republican primary results
Party	Candidate	Votes	%
Republican	Linda McMahon	60,479	49.44%
Republican	Rob Simmons*	34,011	27.80%
Republican	Peter Schiff**	27,831	22.75%
Total votes		122,321	100.00%

* Rob Simmons suspended his campaign on May 25, 2010 but left his name on the ballot. On July 29, he re-entered the race.

** Peter Schiff collected 10,000 signatures to be placed on the ballot via petition.

== General election ==
Two months prior to the general election, observers projected a "vicious contest" due to national committees having to focus attention and resources on Blumenthal's campaign due to revelations made in May that he had served in Vietnam during the Vietnam War (in reality, he had served in the Marine Corps Reserves for six years while receiving multiple deferments that kept him out of Vietnam). In contrast, McMahon was being labeled as CEO of WWE where "under her watch, violence was peddled to kids [and] steroid abuse was rampant". While Blumenthal's lead in the polls plummeted to three points in September, he was billed as being up by 12 points in October. By election day, McMahon was reported as having spent over $40 million on her campaign (roughly over nine times the amount of Blumenthal), which was more money spent than any other Senate candidate that year. Despite this, Blumenthal was viewed by voters in exit polls as "honest and trustworthy" based on his prior record that proved more attractive to voters than McMahon's billing as a successful businesswoman; the two candidates essentially split the independent vote while Blumenthal won the female vote and McMahon narrowly won the male vote.

=== Candidates ===
- Richard Blumenthal (D), state Attorney General
- John Mertens (CFL), professor of engineering
- Warren Mosler (I), economist and entrepreneur
- Linda McMahon (R), businesswoman

=== Debates ===
The first debate between Linda McMahon and Richard Blumenthal in the 2010 Senate race occurred on October 4, 2010, moderated by Fox News Channel anchor Bret Baier and televised live on Fox Connecticut. In the debate, McMahon identified Blumenthal as a career politician, touted her job creation record while CEO of World Wrestling Entertainment, criticized Washington partisanship for Republicans not being invited to the negotiating table during healthcare reform discussions in Congress, and stated that remaining stimulus dollars were a waste that should now be used to pay down debt. Blumenthal as well criticized partisanship, saying that he would have sided with Republicans who voted against the Troubled Assets Relief Program. He also used the debate to argue that middle class tax cuts should not have to wait for current tax rates on top income earners to be extended, stated that he would oppose special interests in Washington, and criticized McMahon for outsourcing WWE products overseas.

- Complete video of debate, October 4, 2010

The Greater Norwalk Chamber of Commerce, Bridgeport Regional Business Council, and Business Council of Fairfield County sponsored a second debate in Norwalk on October 7. It was aired on News 12 Connecticut.

- Complete video of debate, October 7, 2010

A third debate between McMahon and Blumenthal was held on October 12, aired on WTNH sister network MyTV9.

- Complete video of debate, October 12, 2010

=== Predictions ===
Source	Ranking	As of
Cook Political Report	Lean D	October 26, 2010
Rothenberg	Likely D	October 22, 2010
RealClearPolitics	Lean D	October 26, 2010
Sabato's Crystal Ball	Lean D	October 21, 2010
CQ Politics	Lean D	October 26, 2010

=== Polling ===
Poll source	Dates administered	Richard Blumenthal (D)	Linda McMahon (R)
Public Policy Polling	January 4–5, 2010	60%	28%
Rasmussen Reports	January 6, 2010	58%	34%
YouGovPolimetrix	January 6–11, 2010	47%	35%
Quinnipiac	January 8–12, 2010	64%	23%
Daily Kos/Research 2000	January 11–13, 2010	56%	34%
Rasmussen Reports	February 1, 2010	56%	36%
Rasmussen Reports	March 2, 2010	60%	31%
Quinnipiac	March 9–15, 2010	61%	28%
Rasmussen Reports	April 7, 2010	55%	35%
Rasmussen Reports	May 4, 2010	52%	39%
Rasmussen Reports	May 18, 2010	48%	45%
Quinnipiac	May 24–25, 2010	56%	31%
Daily Kos/Research 2000	May 24–26, 2010	52%	33%
Rasmussen Reports	June 1, 2010	56%	33%
Quinnipiac	June 2–8, 2010	55%	35%
Quinnipiac	July 7–13, 2010	54%	37%
Rasmussen Reports	July 15, 2010	53%	40%
Quinnipiac	July 28 – August 2, 2010	50%	40%
Rasmussen Reports	August 11, 2010	47%	40%
Rasmussen Reports	September 9, 2010	53%	44%
Quinnipiac	September 8–12, 2010	51%	45%
Quinnipiac	September 21–26, 2010	49%	46%
Rasmussen Reports	September 26, 2010	50%	45%
Public Policy Polling	September 30 – October 2, 2010	53%	41%
CNN/Time/Opinion Research	October 1–5, 2010	54%	41%
Fox News/Pulse Opinion Research	October 2, 2010	52%	42%
Greenberg Quinlan Rosner	October 3–4, 2010	53%	38%
CT Capitol Report/Merriman River Group	October 3, 2010	52%	45%
Rasmussen Reports	October 5, 2010	54%	43%
Fox News/Pulse Opinion Research	October 9, 2010	49%	43%
Quinnipiac	October 7–11, 2010	54%	43%
Rasmussen Reports	October 14, 2010	51%	46%
Suffolk University	October 19–20, 2010	57%	39%
Quinnipiac University	October 18–24, 2010	54%	42%
Rasmussen Reports	October 24, 2010	56%	43%
CT Capitol Report/Merriman River Group	October 24–26, 2010	52%	44%
Public Policy Polling	October 27–29, 2010	54%	43%
Quinnipiac University	October 25–31, 2010	53%	44%
Rasmussen Reports	October 31, 2010	53%	46%

=== Fundraising ===
Candidate (party)	Receipts	Disbursements	Cash on hand	Debt	As of
Richard Blumenthal (D)	$8,690,397	$8,663,221	$27,176	$2,621,525	November 22, 2010
Linda McMahon (R)	$50,232,567	$49,942,727	$289,839	$500,000	November 22, 2010

_{Source: Federal Election Commission}

=== Results ===

United States Senate election in Connecticut, 2010
Party	Candidate	Votes	%	±%
Democratic	Richard Blumenthal	605,204	52.48%	−13.88%
Working Families	Richard Blumenthal	30,836	2.68%	N/A
Total	Richard Blumenthal	636,040	55.16%	-11.20%
Republican	Linda E. McMahon	498,341	43.22%	+11.08%
Independent	Warren B. Mosler	11,275	0.98%	N/A
Connecticut for Lieberman	John Mertens	6,735	0.58%	N/A
Write-in		724	0.06%	N/A
Total votes		1,153,115	100.0%	
Democratic hold				

==== By county ====
County	Richard Blumenthal Democratic		Linda McMahon Republican		Various candidates Other parties		Total votes cast	
County	Fairfield	146,926	51.6%	134,242	47.15%	3,555	1.24%	284,723
Hartford	168,891	58.44%	115,628	40.01%	4,459	1.55%	288,978	
Litchfield	32,824	44.98%	38,888	53.29%	1,267	1.73%	72,979	
Middlesex	36,258	55.44%	27,991	42.8%	1,150	1.76%	65,399	
New Haven	153,377	57.97%	107,376	40.58%	3,828	1.45%	264,581	
New London	49,286	57.36%	34,810	40.51%	1,832	2.13%	85,928	
Tolland	28,638	53.11%	24,148	44.78%	1,137	2.11%	53,923	
Windham	19,840	55.3%	15,258	42.53%	782	2.18%	35,880	
Total	636,040	55.16%	498,341	43.22%	18,734	1.62%	1,153,115	

Counties that flipped from Democratic to Republican

- Litchfield (largest city: Torrington)

==== By congressional district ====
Blumenthal won all five congressional districts.

District	Blumenthal	McMahon	Representative
1st	59%	39%	John B. Larson
2nd	55%	43%	Joe Courtney
3rd	61%	38%	Rosa DeLauro
4th	52%	47%	Jim Himes
5th	50%	49%	Chris Murphy
