= United States v. McMahon =

1994 criminal court case

United States v. McMahon et al.
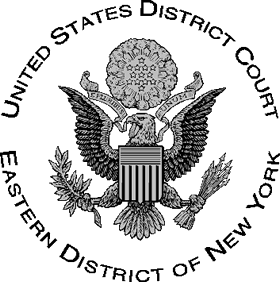
- Court: United States District Court for the Eastern District of New York
- Full case name: United States of America v. Vincent K. McMahon and Titan Sports, Inc., d/b/a "World Wrestling Federation"
- Decided: July 23, 1994
- Citation: 9:93-cr-01276

Court membership
- Judge sitting: Jacob Mishler

Case opinions
- Jury found Vince McMahon not guilty

United States v. McMahon et al (9:93-cr-01276) was a 1994 United States District Court for the Eastern District of New York criminal court case brought against Vince McMahon, chairman of the World Wrestling Federation, in which the government accused him of supplying illegal anabolic steroids to his professional wrestlers. The jury found McMahon not guilty on July 23, 1994.

== Background ==
Vince McMahon was the chairman of Titan Sports Inc., the parent company of the World Wrestling Federation (WWF), a professional wrestling promotion. In the late 1980s, the WWF had undergone a large expansion from being a National Wrestling Alliance (NWA) regional territorial wrestling promotion into an independent national one.

In 1991, Dr. George Zahorian III, a Pennsylvania doctor who had worked as a ringside doctor for the WWF, had been convicted of illegally supplying anabolic steroids. At his trial, it was revealed that Zahorian had supplied steroids to the WWF and their wrestlers, specifically to Vince McMahon's office at Titan Towers. The WWF CEO Linda McMahon, married to Vince, had sent a memo in 1989 advising that Zahorian should not be used by the WWF prior to his arrest and trial on the grounds of suspicion of illicit steroids distribution. In 1992, prior to being indicted, Vince McMahon closed down the World Bodybuilding Federation that he owned.

As a result of Zahorian cooperating with prosecutors, McMahon was indicted in 1993. The United States Attorney for the Eastern District of New York, Zachary W. Carter charged McMahon with conspiring to distribute steroids, possession of illegal steroids with intent to distribute, and embezzlement for allegedly using money from Titan Sports Inc to purchase illegal steroids.

Prior to the trial, McMahon had lost a civil lawsuit brought by Jesse "The Body" Ventura over $800,000 owed in royalties for Ventura's color commentary on WWF programming. That case, coupled with the steroid charges, was seen as a major downturn in McMahon's fortunes. Furthermore, the charges came at a time when sexual abuse allegations involving the WWF were made public, as former referee Rita Chatterton appeared on Geraldo Rivera's television programs and accused McMahon of raping her, while allegations of child sexual abuse were made against other WWF employees.

The case was set to be heard at the United States District Court for the Eastern District of New York rather than in McMahon's and the WWF's home state of Connecticut. This was because the prosecutors alleged that the distribution of steroids occurred in Long Island. The trial was due to start in June 1994 but was delayed until the following month. Ted Turner, the owner of the WWF's rival World Championship Wrestling (WCW), suggested that he would try to get CNN to cover the trial for Turner Broadcasting System.

== Trial ==
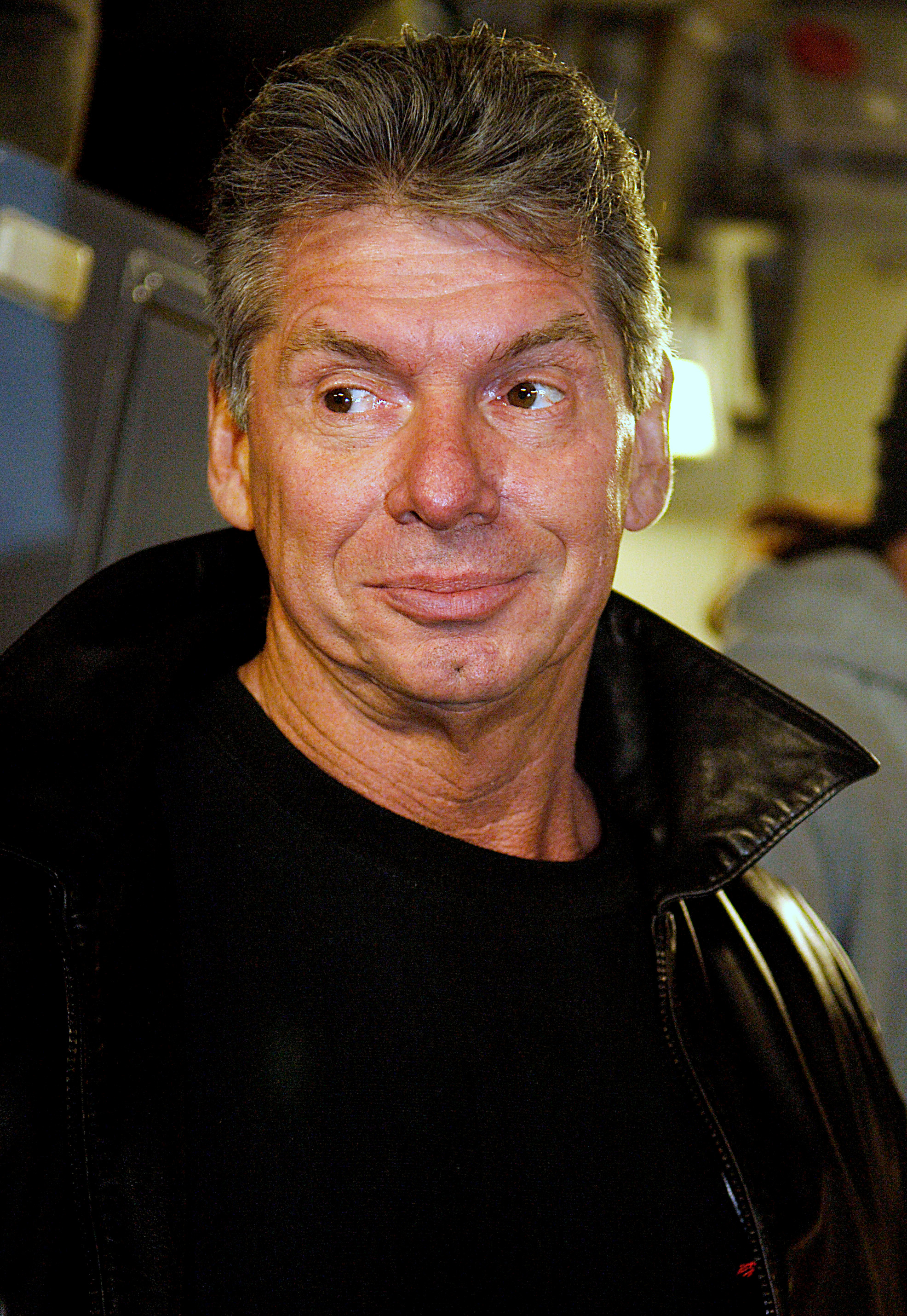
WWF chairman Vince McMahon was found not guilty.

The United States government brought six charges against McMahon; however, three of the six were thrown out of court before the full trial. The three that remained were for two counts of distributing steroids and one of conspiracy to distribute steroids. The case was heard by Judge Jacob Mishler. The prosecution alleged that McMahon was in charge of distribution of illegal steroids to WWF wrestlers; they also charged that McMahon had required wrestlers to take steroids while they were in the WWF. Appearing as the prosecution's main witness was Hulk Hogan, who had been the WWF's biggest star during the expansion and was working for WCW at the time of the trial. Testifying under immunity from prosecution, Hogan said that while he had taken steroids previously under his own prescription for medical purposes and received them from Zahorian with his fanmail and paychecks, McMahon had never asked him to take any nor bought any on his behalf.

Eleven wrestlers, including Hogan, were called to testify by the prosecution. No wrestlers called to the stand attested that McMahon had supplied them with steroids, apart from Nailz. Nailz claimed that McMahon had pressured him into taking steroids to make him bigger. However, McMahon's defense attorney argued that Nailz was a hostile witness, as he had been fired from the WWF previously and was disgruntled and looking for revenge. Nailz contradicted himself during his testimony by stating that he had no animosity towards McMahon but later answered in the affirmative that he hated McMahon.

McMahon's legal team did not enter a defense. McMahon's lawyer stated he had only had one discussion with Zahorian about steroids and that was over McMahon's concerns about the health of his wrestlers. Judge Mishler dismissed the distribution charges on the grounds that the prosecution had provided insufficient evidence that they occurred within the court's jurisdiction. The jury deliberated for sixteen hours on the conspiracy charge before pronouncing a "not guilty" verdict. McMahon stated that he had used steroids before they became illegal in 1991 under the Controlled Substances Act. McMahon declared his company drug-free and that the WWF had brought in a "tough independent drug-testing policy" following this. Any WWF wrestler caught with drugs would be fired, as occurred a year later when Crush was arrested for being in possession of steroids and marijuana in Hawaii. He was fired by the WWF as a result, in accordance with McMahon's new policy.

== Consequences ==
Zahorian was sentenced to three years in prison after his conviction. By 2010, he had resumed practicing medicine in Harrisburg, Pennsylvania.

After the trial, the WWF retained their drug-testing policy brought in as a result of the investigation and even used it in their Billionaire Ted skits on WWF programming to make the point that WCW did not have one. However, according to Linda, they suspended it in 1996 due to cost. The WWF also started promoting smaller wrestlers rather than the muscular ones that they had since the 1980s. In 2003, the trial was used as a part of angle for a feud between Hogan and McMahon which culminated in them having a wrestling match at WrestleMania XIX which was won by Hogan.

During Linda McMahon's 2010 United States Senate campaign, the steroid trial was used by her political opponents to attack her. A lawyer representing WWE stated that she was unrelated to the scandal.

In a 2023 interview, Nailz claimed he was forced to testify by federal prosecutors. He reportedly told the Department of Justice to "get lost" when they asked him to testify against McMahon and asserted the next day that the FBI gave him a subpoena to force him to attend. He also alleged that they would pay him for his testimony. Despite this allegation, McMahon's defense previously claimed during the trial that Nailz held a grudge with McMahon. Nailz and McMahon were also acknowledged to have filed lawsuits against each other in 1992 after Nailz alleged McMahon sexually assaulted him.

== Media portrayals ==
The trial was the focus of an episode of the third season of the Viceland pro wrestling docuseries Dark Side of the Ring. On July 26, 2021, it was reported that a television series adaptation of McMahon's life was in development by WWE Studios and Blumhouse Television. Titled The United States of America vs. Vince McMahon, the series will be a fictionalized version of the court case.
