= Marina Umaschi Bers =

American child educator and computer scientist

- Education: Massachusetts Institute of Technology
- Scientific career
- Thesis: Identity construction environments : the design of computational tools for exploring a sense of self and moral values (2001)
- Doctoral advisor: Seymour Papert

Marina Umaschi Bers is the Augustus Long Professor of Education at Boston College. Bers holds a secondary appointment in Boston College's Department of Computer Science. Bers directs the interdisciplinary DevTech Research Group, which she started in 2001 at Tufts University. Her research involves the design and study of innovative learning technologies to promote children's positive development. She is known for her work in the field of early childhood computer science with projects of national and international visibility. Bers is the co-creator of the free ScratchJr programming language, used by 35 million children, and the creator of the KIBO robotic kit, which has no screens or keyboards.

== Education ==
Marina Umaschi Bers went to Buenos Aires University in Argentina and received her undergraduate degree in Social Communications (1993). In 1994, she earned a master's degree in Educational Media and Technology from Boston University; she also has an M.S. from Massachusetts Institute of Technology. In 2001, she earned a Ph.D. from the MIT Media Laboratory working under the mentorship of Seymour Papert.

In 2001, Bers created her research group, the Developmental Technologies, or DevTech, at the Eliot-Pearson Department of Child Development at Tufts University. In 2018, she was named the chair of the Eliot-Pearson Dept. of Child Development.

In 2022, she moved to Boston College as the August Long Professor of Education at the Lynch School of Education and Human Development. Bers received an appointment in Boston College's Department of Computer Science and is an affiliated faculty with the Schiller Institute for Integrated Science and Society.

Bers co-founded KinderLab Robotics in 2013, and has worked with WGBH-TV and PBS on content for children's broadcasting.

== Research and work ==
Bers’ research centers around the potential of technology to foster the development of children. Her early work examined storytelling and language in children, robotics in early childhood education, and the development of values in virtual environments. In 2012 she developed the TangibleK robotics program to teach young children about the world of technology. Bers developed the ScratchJr programming language collaboratively with Mitch Resnick, Paula Bonta, and Brian Silverman. ScratchJr targets children from ages 5 to 7, and is an offshoot of Scratch which is used to teach programming to children from 8 to 16 computer programming. Bers also works to train childhood educators on the use of technology in the classroom and develops curriculum that can be used to teach programming and computational thinking. She developed the KIBO robot kit, a robot that young children can program with wooden blocks and serves as a tool to teach children computer programming. Prof. Bers lead the development of the interdisciplinary Learning, Design and Technology, MA program within the Department of Formative Education at the Lynch School at Boston College and she serves as director of the program.

== Published books ==
- Bers, M. U. (2008). Blocks to Robots: Learning with Technology in the Early Childhood Classroom. Teachers College, Columbia.
- Bers, M. U. (2012). Designing Digital Experiences for Positive Youth Development: From Playpen to Playground. Oxford.
- Bers, M. U. & Resnick, M. (2015). The Official ScratchJr Book. No Starch Press.
- Bers, M. U. & Sullivan, A. (2018) The Official ScratchJr Coding Cards. No Starch Press.
- Bers, M. U. (2018). Coding as a Playground: Programming and Coding in the Early Childhood Classroom. Routledge.
- Bers, M. U. (2021). Coding as a Playground: Programming and Coding in the Early Childhood Classroom (Second Edition). Routledge.
- Bers, M. U. (2021). Teaching computational thinking and coding to young children. IGI Global.
- Bers, M. U. (2022). Beyond coding: How children learn human values through programming. MIT Press.
- Bers, M. U. (2022). Programación y Valores: Cómo los niños aprenden valores humanos a través de la computación (Spanish Translation of Beyond Coding). Ediciones Logos.

== Awards and honors ==
In 2005, Bers received the Presidential Early Career Award for Scientists and Engineers (PECASE), the highest honor given by the U.S. government to outstanding investigators. She received a National Science Foundation (NSF)'s Young Investigator's Career Award, and the American Educational Research Association (AERA) Jan Hawkins Award for Early Career Contributions to Humanistic Research and Scholarship in Learning Technologies.

In 2015, she was chosen as one of the recipients of the Boston Business Journal’s Women to Watch in Science and Technology awards, and, in 2016, she received the Outstanding Faculty Contribution to Graduate Student Studies award at Tufts University. She was elected fellow of the American Educational Research Association (AERA) in 2022. She was also elected a member of the National Academy of Education in 2023. In 2024, she was knighted as Dama de la Imperial Orden de Carlos V, which recognizes individuals whose work has contributed to Spain.
