= Greg Sindelar =

American nonprofit executive

- Education: Texas A&M University
- Occupations: CEO of Texas Public Policy Foundation; Interim president and CEO of America First Policy Institute

Greg Sindelar is an American nonprofit executive who is the CEO of the Texas Public Policy Foundation and as the interim president and CEO of the America First Policy Institute.

Sindelar joined the Texas Public Policy Institute (TPPF) in 2007. At that time, the organization mostly focused on publishing research. Over the years, it began to focus more on working with lawmakers and legislators to advocate directly for legislation. Sindelar said policy change is based on relationships and "just producing research wasn't enough to turn it into reality." During his tenure at TPPF, Sindelar was director of operations, chief operating officer, and executive director. He played a key role in TPPF's opening of an office in Washington, D.C. In 2021, Sindelar succeeded Kevin Roberts as CEO of TPPF.

In early 2025, Sindelar became interim president and CEO of the America First Policy Institute (AFPI). AFPI is a policy organization launched in 2021 by Brooke Rollins, Linda McMahon, and Larry Kudlow "to advance policies that put the American people first." Upon becoming interim CEO, Sindelar said "This is about thinking not even five years down the road. This is about thinking 100 years down the road, and how do we make AFPI a permanent institution in the public square." Sindelar also said "I think a lot of the ideas that started and emanated from Texas found their way in the previous Trump administration."
