= Larry Weber =

American entrepreneur

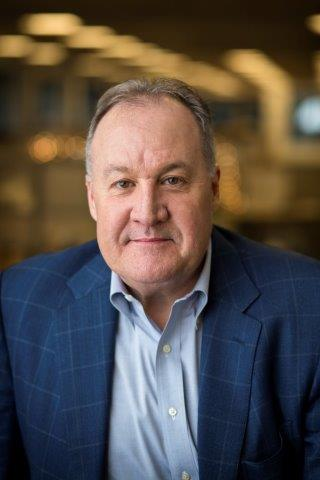
- Weber in 2014
- Born: July 7, 1955 (age 70); Columbus, Ohio, US
- Education: Gilmour Academy; Denison University; Antioch College
- Title: Founder, Chairman, and CEO
- Board member of: Pegasystems; The Clubhouse Network; The Computer Museum

Larry Weber (born July 7, 1955) is an American entrepreneur and the founder, chairman & CEO of Racepoint Global, a communications agency headquartered in Boston. He has been CEO of both mid-and large-scale companies, and has founded several other public relations and interactive marketing agencies including The Weber Group, ThunderHouse and W2. His clients have included AT&T, Boston Scientific, Coca-Cola, Deere, General Electric, General Motors, IBM, Kaiser Permanente, Lotus, Microsoft, Panasonic, SAP, and Verizon Wireless.

Weber co-founded the Massachusetts Innovation & Technology Exchange (MITX), and was Executive Chairman of the MITX Board of Directors. He also sits on the board of directors of Pegasystems, Inc. (PEGA) and the Clubhouse Network, and was on the board of Macromill Group, the Council on Competitiveness, and the Chair of the board of the Computer Museum. He is the author of several books including Authentic Marketing: How to Capture Hearts and Minds Through the Power of Purpose (2019) and A New Age of Reason: Harnessing the Power of Tech for Good (2024).

== Career ==
=== The Weber Group ===
Weber started his own public relations company, The Weber Group, in 1987, and shortly after launched Thunderhouse, an interactive marketing firm. Within 10 years, The Weber Group was the world's largest and most established technology public relations firm. Its clients included Verizon Wireless, SAP, Microsoft, IBM, General Motors, Hewlett Packard, Citrix, AOL, Lotus, and AT&T, among others.

=== Weber Shandwick and The Interpublic Group of Companies ===
The Interpublic Group of Companies purchased The Weber Group in late 1996. During his time at IPG, Weber led the purchase of 21 public relations companies, among them Shandwick International, BSMG Worldwide, and GolinHarris. In 1999, Weber engineered the merger of Weber Shandwick and BSMG Worldwide to form the world's largest public relations firm, and the company became Weber Shandwick Worldwide.

In early 2000, Weber was named chairman and CEO of Interpublic's Advanced Marketing Services group, a $3 billion unit including the company's public relations, research and analysis, and entertainment holdings.

=== The W2 Group and Racepoint Global ===
After leaving Interpublic, he founded the W2 Group and Racepoint Group in 2004.

==== W2 Group ====
The W2 Group was created as a holding company under which global marketing companies could be bought and CMOs advised. In 2007 it received its first funding round and in 2008 it had five companies. It was organized into three groups: the companies, the innovations, and the content.

==== Racepoint Global ====
Racepoint, founded in 2004, is one of Massachusetts’ largest public relations firms, with clients that have included ARM, Dassault Systèmes, Deere, Kaiser-Permanente, Forrester, Panasonic, and the Pittsburgh Steelers. Weber was the chairman and CEO of the firm. In 2013, Weber merged Racepoint with its sister company, Digital Influence Group, a social media marketing firm to create Racepoint Global.

==== Counseling governments ====
In addition to counseling many tech brands on marketing and business strategy, Weber provided PR direction for governments including the Kingdom of Jordan, Libya, and Rwanda. He also led the marketing of the XO laptop by One Laptop per Child (OLPC). OLPC aims to provide laptops to school-age children all over the world. It has been introduced in Afghanistan, Haiti, Pakistan, Rwanda, and South Africa. In 2008, Racepoint Group won the United Nations Grand Award for “excellence in communication” for its OLPC campaign.

Weber is also a guest lecturer at Tuck School of Business at Dartmouth College.

== Appointments ==
Weber is on the board of Pegasystem and The Clubhouse Network. He was the co-founder and chairman of the Massachusetts Innovation and Technology Exchange (MITX). He was on the executive committee of the Council on Competitiveness, the Macromill Group, on the board of Babson College for 11 years, and chairman of the Computer Museum’s board of trustees.

== Bibliography ==
As of 2024, Weber is the author of the following books:

- A New Age of Reason: Harnessing the Power of Tech for Good. Wiley, 2024. ISBN 1394216602
- Authentic Marketing: How to Capture Hearts and Minds Through the Power of Purpose. Wiley, 2019. ISBN 1119513758
- The Digital Marketer: Ten New Skills You Must Learn to Stay Relevant and Customer-Centric. Wiley, 2014. ISBN 1118760832
- Everywhere: Comprehensive Digital Business Strategy for the Social Media Era. Wiley, 2011. ISBN 0470651709
- Sticks and Stones: How Digital Business Reputations Are Created Over Time and Lost in a Click. Wiley, 2009. ISBN 0470457384
- Marketing to the Social Web. Wiley, 2007; second edition 2009. ISBN 0470410973
- The Provocateur. Crown, 2002. ISBN 0609608266
