= Natalie Rusk =

Computer scientist

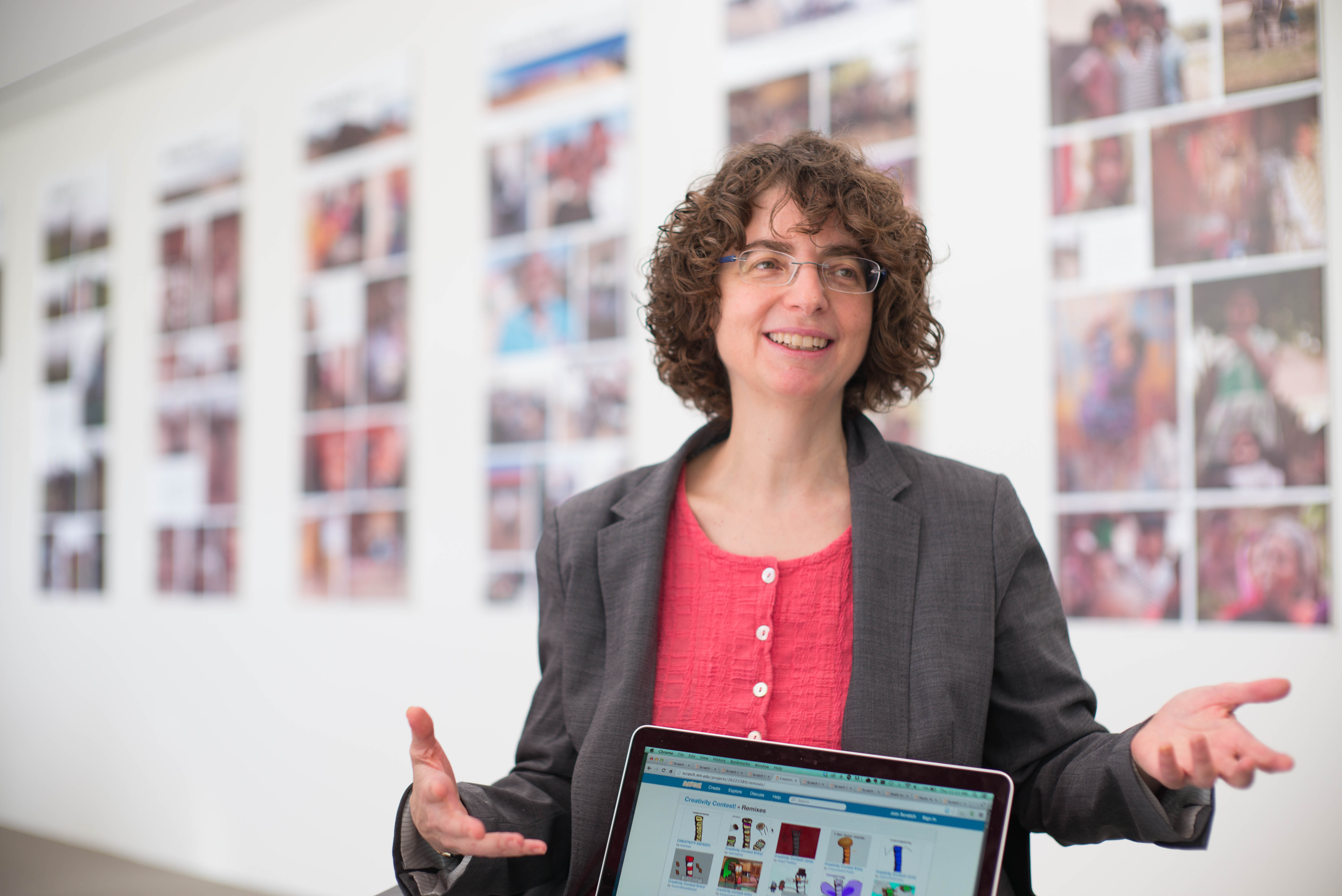
- Born: February 2, 1965 (age 61)
- Education: Brown University (BA); Harvard University (EdM); Tufts University (PhD)
- Known for: Scratch; Computer Clubhouse
- Scientific career
- Fields: Learning; Motivation; Emotions; Educational programs Educational technology Youth Development
- Workplaces: Massachusetts Institute of Technology
- Thesis: Learning goals for emotion regulation: A randomized intervention study (2011)
- Doctoral advisor: Fred Rothbaum
- Website: web.media.mit.edu/~nrusk/

Natalie Rusk is a research scientist in the Lifelong Kindergarten (LLK) group, part of the MIT Media Lab at the Massachusetts Institute of Technology.

== Education ==
Rusk was educated at Brown University where she graduated with a Bachelor of Arts degree with a focus on Chinese language, Chinese literature and Computer science in 1988. She moved to the Harvard Graduate School of Education where she was awarded a Master of Education (EdM) degree specializing in educational technology in 1989. She completed her PhD in child development supervised by Fred Rothbaum at Tufts University in 2011. Her thesis used a randomized controlled trial to investigate learning goals for emotional self-regulation.

== Career and research ==
Rusk's research interests are in learning, motivation, emotions, educational technology and child development. Rusk co-founded the Computer Clubhouse, a network of after-school activities serving children and young adults, in 1993. Rusk is a co-creator of Scratch, a programming language and online community designed for children to make and share computer animations, video games, interactive stories, and other media. She has collaborated extensively with Mitchel Resnick on technology education and computer science education for young people.

Rusk is the lead author of Scratch Coding Cards and editor of Start Making, a guide to engaging young people in maker culture.

=== Awards and honors ===
Rusk was the keynote speaker at the Cambridge Computing Education Research Symposium (CCERS) hosted by the Raspberry Pi Foundation and the University of Cambridge in 2020.
