= Blocks to Robots =

2008 book by Marina Umaschi Bers

Blocks to Robots: Learning with Technology in the Early Childhood Classroom
- Author: Marina Umaschi Bers
- Language: English
- Subject: Robotics
- Publisher: Teachers College, Columbia University
- Publication date: February 1, 2008
- Publication place: United States
- Pages: 154
- ISBN: 978-0-8077-4847-3

Blocks to Robots: Learning with Technology in the Early Childhood Classroom (2008) is an educational guide book by Marina Umaschi Bers that introduces the idea of learning with technology in the early childhood classroom.

Research shows that attitudes about science, math, and technology start to form during early education. This book shows how to successfully use technology in the classroom, using a constructivist approach to teaching and learning. Bers focusses on robotic manipulatives that allow children to explore complex concepts in a concrete and fun way.

== Reviews ==
- "Blocks to robots; learning with technology in the early childhood classroom.(Brief Article)(Book Review)". Reference & Research Book News. February 1, 2008.
- Hubbell, Elizabeth R. (February 22, 2008). "(Book Review) Blocks to Robots: Learning with Technology in the Early Childhood Classroom". Teachers College Record (ID Number: 15023).
