= Gilmour Academy =

Catholic school in Gates Mills, Ohio, US

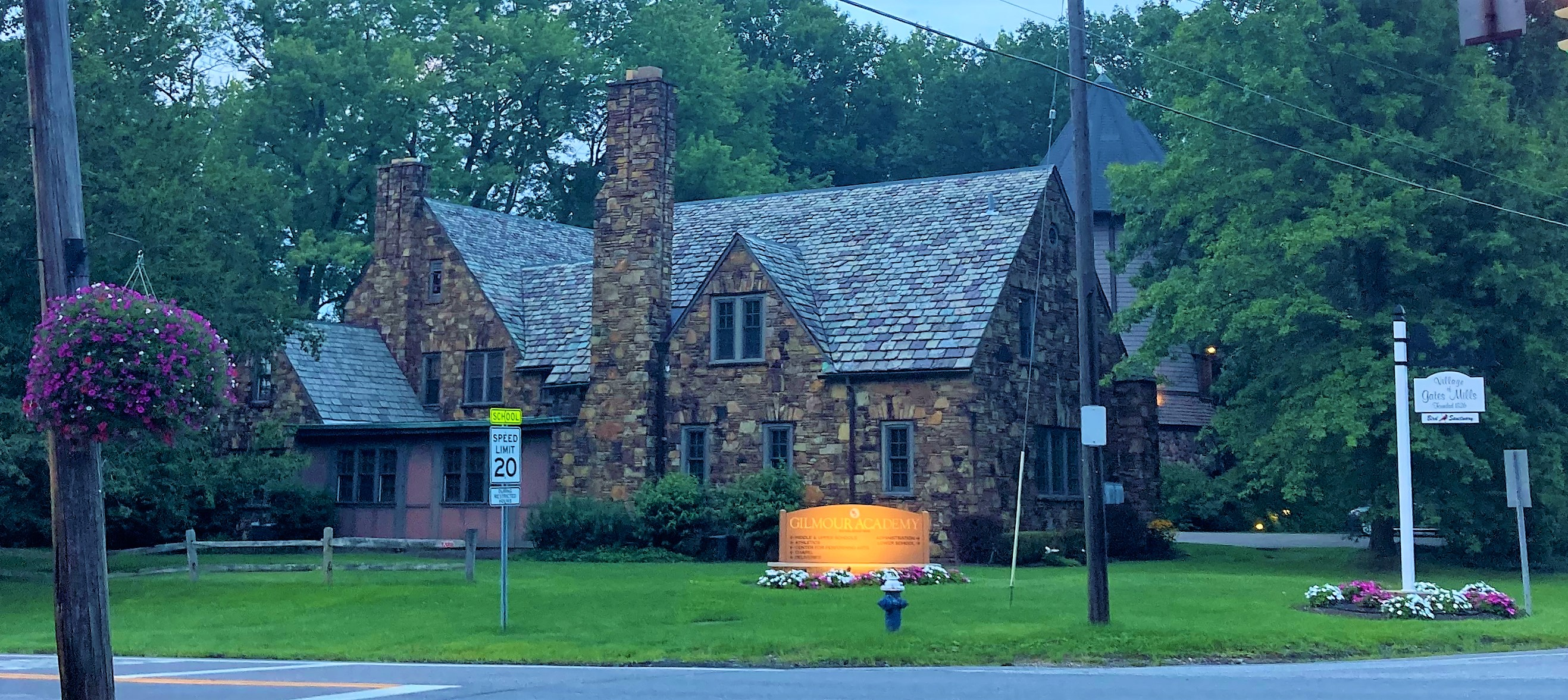

Location
- 34001 Cedar Road; Gates Mills, Ohio 44040; United States; 41°30′14″N 81°26′13″W

Information
- Type: Private, Coeducational Day and boarding school
- Motto: To develop the competence to see and the courage to act in creating a more humane and just society.
- Religious affiliation: Catholic Church (Congregation of Holy Cross)
- Established: 1946
- Head of School: Kathleen Kenny
- Faculty: 74 Full-Time Faculty
- Grades: Toddler (18 months)-12
- Enrollment: 771 (2023-2024)
- Student to teacher ratio: 9.0
- Campus: Suburban, 144 acres (0.58 km^{2})
- Colors: Blue & grey
- Nickname: Lancers
- Website: www.gilmour.org

Gilmour Academy is an independent, Catholic, coeducational, college-preparatory day and boarding school in the Cleveland suburb of Gates Mills, Ohio, United States. Founded in 1946 by the Brothers of Holy Cross, Gilmour Academy has three divisions, Lower School, Middle School and Upper School. In the Lower School, Gilmour offers a Montessori preschool program for 18 months - PreK. The Lower School also houses the children in Kindergarten through Grade 6. Gilmour's Middle School holds 7th and 8th grades, and, as of the 2021–2022 school year, has 65 students. At nearly 500 students, Gilmour's Upper School has grades 9-12 (and also offers a post-grad option). A boarding program is available to students in grades 9–12.

Gilmour Academy is chartered through the state of Ohio and accredited through the Independent School Association of Central States (ISCACS). It is a member of the National Association of Independent Schools (NAIS), the Ohio Association of Independent Schools (OAIS), the Cleveland Council of Independent Schools (CCIS) and the Coalition of Essential Schools (CES).

== Campus ==
Gilmour Academy's Tudor House

Gilmour's 144-acre (0.58 km^{2}) campus has experienced significant growth and expansion in recent years. The Lynn and Michael Kelley Middle School houses a Broadcast Media Center and Digital Media Lab where students can learn and practice with digital media technology. The Lorraine and Bill Dodero Center for Performing Arts was completed in early 2020 and opened with The Broadway Princess Party and Beauty and the Beast, Jr. Also opening its doors in 2020 was the Nature-Based Learning Center, which is home to the giving garden and in close proximity to the "Gilmour Girls" chicken coop and apiary. Our Lady Chapel (which opened in 1994) serves as a venue for liturgical events and student convocation. Gilmour's Athletic Center (which opened in 2009) houses a pool, main gym and a three-court field house and the Floyd E. Stefanski Ice Center houses two NHL-sized ice rinks and a fitness center. New artificial turf was installed in 2020 in a multiple-use field for football, soccer, and lacrosse.

== Curriculum ==
Service is important to Gilmour for developing their students. A part of the Saint Andre Bessette Christian Service Program, each student is required to complete at a minimum of 60 hours of service before they walk across the stage.

== Boarding program ==
Murphy Residence Hall

Gilmour maintains a boarding program for students in grades 9–12. It has resident students from 11 countries and 19 states, who live in a 70-occupancy building. The residence program includes supervised study hall, chaperoned activities, and personal advising and mentoring.

== Athletics ==
Gilmour's athletic teams are known as the Lancers. The school competes in the Ohio High School Athletic Association.

=== Ohio High School Athletic Association State Championships ===
- Boys' golf – 1991, 1992, 1993, 1994, 2010
- Boys' ice hockey 2022, 2026
- Boys' track and field – 1971
- Girls' track and field – 2005, 2006, 2007*, 2009
- Girls' cross country – 2006
- Girls' volleyball – 2015, 2020, 2021, 2024
- Girls' soccer – 2016
- Girls' basketball – 2017

* tie

== Notable alumni ==
- Gary Cohn, President & COO of Goldman, Sachs; Director of the National Economic Council and chief economic advisor to President Donald Trump; Vice-chairman of IBM
- Matthew J. Dolan, Ohio State Senator
- Paul Dolan, chairman/CEO of the Cleveland Guardians Major League Baseball organization
- Ray Gricar, former District Attorney of Centre County, Pennsylvania
- Naz Hillmon, basketball player
- Douglas Kenney, writer, actor, and producer
- Phil Robinson, politician
- Phoebe Robinson, comedian, actress, podcaster, and author
- Barbara Romer, film producer
- Art Rooney II, president of the Pittsburgh Steelers National Football League organization
- Andy Selfridge, football player
- Steve Skrovan, Emmy Award winning producer, writer, director and television host
- John W. Snow, 73rd United States Secretary of the Treasury
- Brian Stepanek, film/television actor
- Larry Weber, American entrepreneur and the founder, chairman & CEO of Racepoint Global
