= Linda McMahon =

American administrator and business executive (born 1948)

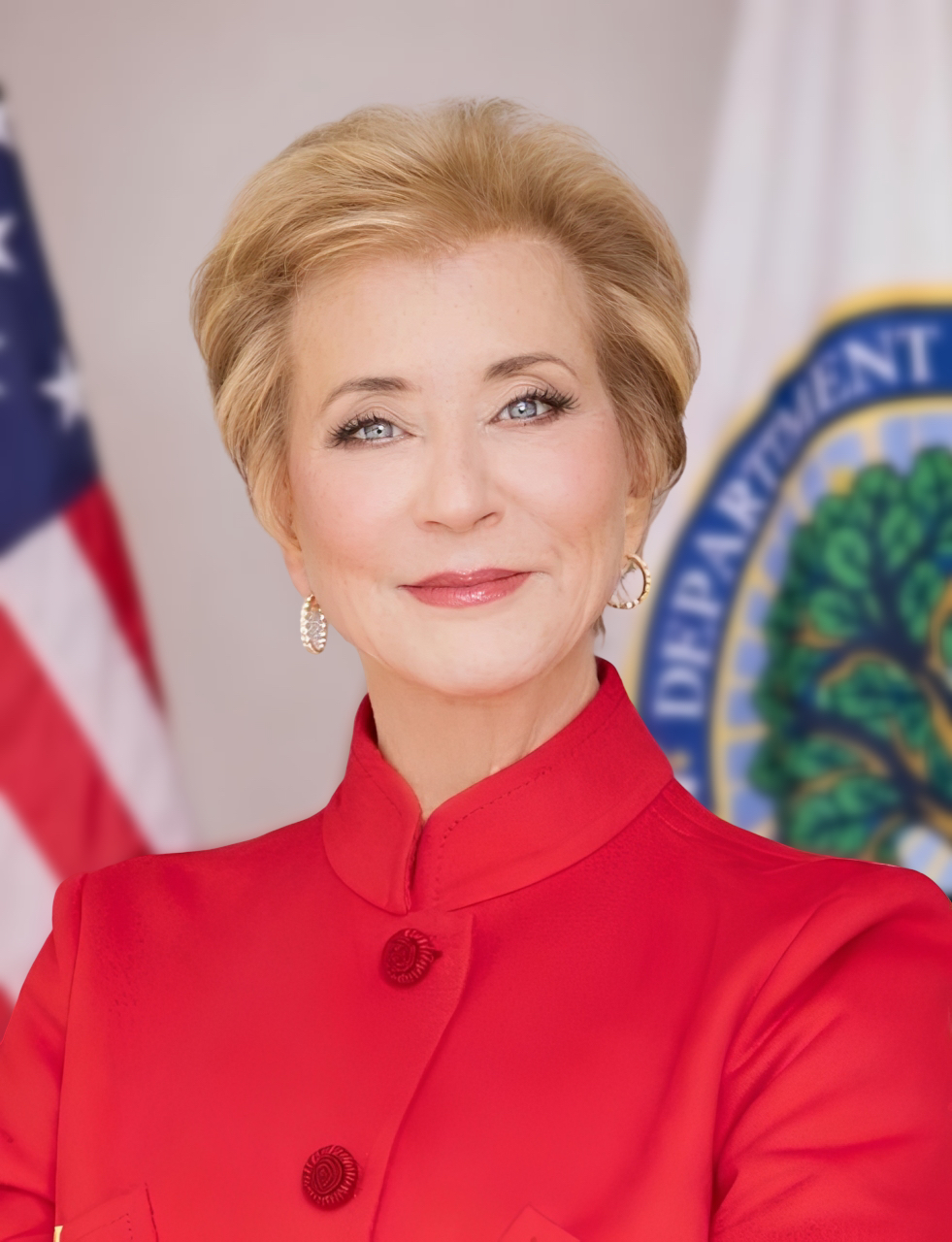
- Official portrait, 2026

13th United States Secretary of Education
- Incumbent
- Assumed office March 3, 2025
- President: Donald Trump
- Deputy: Richard Smith (acting); Nicholas Kent (acting)
- Preceded by: Miguel Cardona

25th Administrator of the Small Business Administration
- In office February 14, 2017 – April 12, 2019
- President: Donald Trump
- Deputy: Althea Coetzee
- Preceded by: Maria Contreras-Sweet
- Succeeded by: Jovita Carranza

Member of the Connecticut State Board of Education
- In office February 28, 2009 – April 1, 2010
- Appointed by: Jodi Rell
- Preceded by: Alice Carolan
- Succeeded by: Pamela Partridge West

Personal details
- Born: Linda Marie Edwards; October 4, 1948 (age 78) New Bern, North Carolina, U.S.
- Party: Republican
- Spouse: Vince McMahon (m. 1966, separated)
- Children: Shane; Stephanie
- Relatives: McMahon family
- Education: East Carolina University (BA)

Linda Marie McMahon (/məkˈmæn/ mək-MAN; née Edwards; born October 4, 1948) is an American administrator, business executive and former professional wrestling executive who has served as the 13th United States secretary of education since 2025. A member of the Republican Party, she previously served as the 25th administrator of the Small Business Administration from 2017 to 2019.

McMahon, along with her husband, Vince McMahon, founded sports entertainment company Titan Sports (later World Wrestling Entertainment; WWE), where she worked as the president and later chief executive officer from 1980 to 2009. During this time, the company grew from a regional business in the northeast to a large multinational corporation. Among other things, she initiated the company's civic programs, Get R.E.A.L. and SmackDown! Your Vote. She made occasional on-screen performances, most notably in a feud with her husband that culminated at WrestleMania X-Seven. In 2009, she left WWE to run for a seat in the United States Senate from Connecticut as a Republican, but lost to Democrat Richard Blumenthal in the 2010 Senate election. She was the Republican nominee for Connecticut's other Senate seat in the 2012 race, but lost to Democrat Chris Murphy.

On December 7, 2016, President-elect Donald Trump announced his nomination of McMahon to be Administrator of the Small Business Administration (SBA) for the first Trump administration. McMahon was confirmed by the U.S. Senate on February 14, 2017, by a vote of 81–19 and sworn in as the 25th administrator of the SBA. On March 29, 2019, the Trump administration announced McMahon would step down as the administrator of the SBA in April to work on his upcoming re-election campaign.

In 2021, McMahon was the founding chairwoman of the America First Policy Institute.

On November 19, 2024, McMahon was nominated by President-elect Trump to serve as U.S. secretary of education for the second Trump administration. McMahon was confirmed to the office by the U.S. Senate on March 3, 2025, by a vote of 51–45. McMahon was sworn in as the 13th U.S. secretary of education on March 3, 2025.

== Early life and education ==
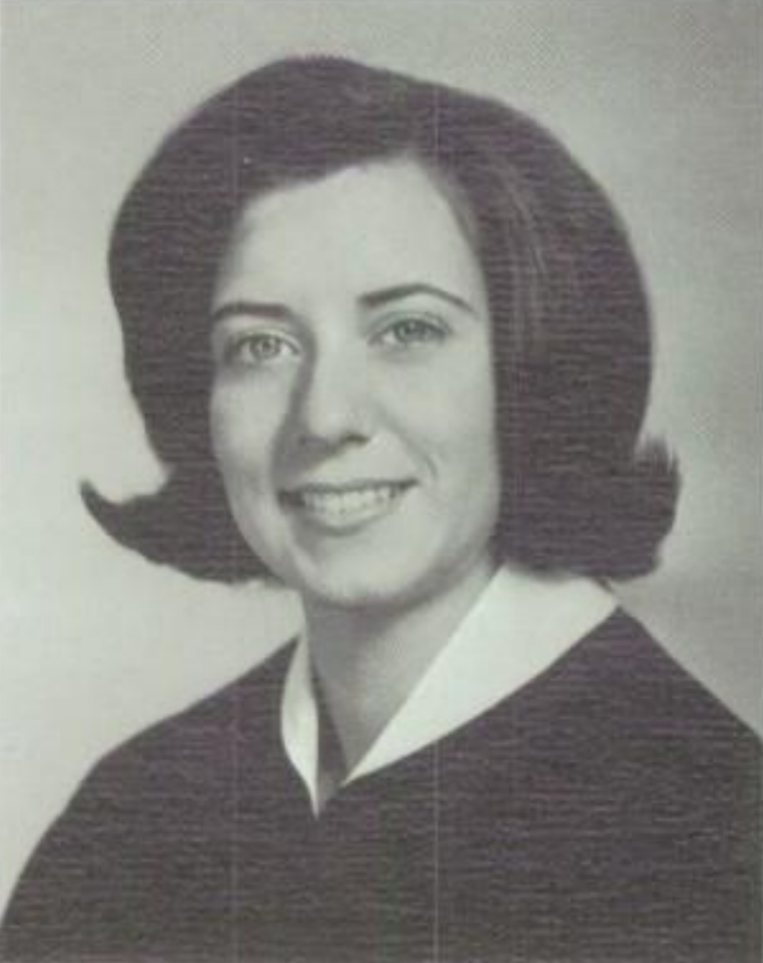
McMahon's 1966 high school senior year yearbook photo.

McMahon was born Linda Marie Edwards in New Bern, North Carolina, in a Welsh-American family, the daughter of Evelyn and Henry Edwards. She was an only child and grew up as a "tomboy" playing basketball and baseball. Her parents were both employees at Marine Corps Air Station Cherry Point, a military base. She grew up in a conservative Baptist family, but converted to Roman Catholicism in her later years.

Linda M. Edwards, at the age of 13, met Vince McMahon, who was then 16. Her mother worked in the same building as McMahon's mother, but they had not previously met.

Vince's mother became good friends with the Edwards family, and Vince, who had lived with several abusive stepfathers, enjoyed the feeling of stability that he felt at their home. Edwards and McMahon dated throughout their high school years; she attended New Bern High School and he attended Fishburne Military School in Virginia. During this time, Vince was a "permanent fixture" at her home, and spent hours with Linda and her family.

Shortly after her high school graduation, Vince asked her to marry him. They married on August 26, 1966, when she was 17, and he was 21. She enrolled at East Carolina University in 1966, where she obtained a bachelor's degree in French. The academic program she completed was designed to prepare teachers for instruction. From 1968 to 1971, Vince worked as a traveling cup salesman before joining his father's company, the World Wide Wrestling Federation (WWWF, later WWF, now WWE). Their son Shane was born in 1970, followed by daughter Stephanie in 1976.

== Early career ==
In 1969, the McMahons moved to Gaithersburg, Maryland. Linda worked as a receptionist at the corporate law firm of Covington & Burling; she translated French documents, trained as a paralegal in the probate department, and studied intellectual property rights.

Financially, the couple fared poorly for several years and, despite her husband working at a quarry, briefly received food stamps. In 1976, after a series of failed business ventures including financing stunt performer Evel Knievel's Snake River Canyon Jump, and while pregnant with Stephanie, McMahon and her husband filed for bankruptcy.

By 1979, Vince decided to start promoting wrestling events at the Cape Cod Coliseum. He purchased the Coliseum in Massachusetts and founded Titan Sports, Inc. in 1980. The McMahons held small hockey and other sporting events in addition to wrestling at the Cape Cod Coliseum. At one point, Linda cooked meatball sandwiches to feed the fans at these sporting events. As the company grew, Linda assisted Vince with administration and used her knowledge of intellectual property law to assist in trademark protection for the company. During much of those early years, she had little interest in professional wrestling.

In 1983, the McMahons moved to Greenwich, Connecticut. They have six grandchildren.

== World Wrestling Federation/World Wrestling Entertainment ==
=== Corporate roles ===
Linda McMahon and Vince McMahon co-founded Titan Sports, Inc. in 1980. Many workers in the company referred to her as the "co-chief executive". McMahon became president in 1993 and CEO of the company in 1997. The company's explosive growth and the way it transformed the wrestling industry caused some observers to label her and Vince "business geniuses".

One of her major interests in WWF and WWE was product merchandising. She negotiated many of the company's business deals with outside vendors and established the company's first line of action figures, Wrestling Superstars, in 1984. It was a first in the wrestling industry and helped expand the company's popularity with children. She was also the primary negotiator for the World Wrestling Federation's 2000 TV deal with Viacom.

During an interview with The Detroit News, when asked what it was like being CEO in a "testosterone-charged industry," McMahon replied, "It's lots of fun. I'm an only child, so I grew up as my father's son and mother's daughter. I was quite a jock. I played baseball, basketball—I think that background made Vince and I very compatible. I really have a very good understanding of the male psyche—I'm very comfortable in a guy environment. I have to say that there are very strong women in this company as well. Our human resources division and our consumer goods division are headed by women—It's still a testosterone business, and I like it."

On September 16, 2009, Linda McMahon resigned from her position as CEO of WWE and left WWE to run as a Republican for a seat in the United States Senate from Connecticut.

==== McMahon's memorandum to Pat Patterson ====
In a 1989 memo to the company's vice president, Pat Patterson, McMahon directed Patterson to fire on-call physician George Zahorian and inform him of imminent legal charges charging him with steroid distribution.

Although you and I discussed before about continuing to have Zahorian at our events as the doctor on call, I think that is now not a good idea. Vince agreed, and would like for you to call Zahorian and to tell him not to come to any more of our events and to also clue him in on any action that the Justice Department is thinking of taking.

— Linda McMahon, December 1989 memo

This memo became known publicly as the "Tip-Off Memo" during her campaign for Senate in 2010. It became a political liability used against her in both the nomination and general election campaigns.

==== Federal steroids investigation ====
Following the murder-suicide of Chris Benoit in 2007, the Oversight and Government Reform Committee investigated steroid usage in the wrestling industry. The Committee investigated WWE and Total Nonstop Action Wrestling (TNA), asking for documentation of their companies' drug policies. The McMahons both testified. The documents stated that 75 wrestlers—roughly 40 percent—had tested positive for drug use since 2006, most commonly for steroids.

McMahon was asked why there had been no follow-up during a televised interview with CBS Face the State on January 20, 2010, and responded: "There's not been any follow-up from any of the inquiries that were made because I believe we had furnished thousands of documents and testimony for them, and I think if they looked at our policy and really delved into it, they would be very satisfied."

==== PG rating ====
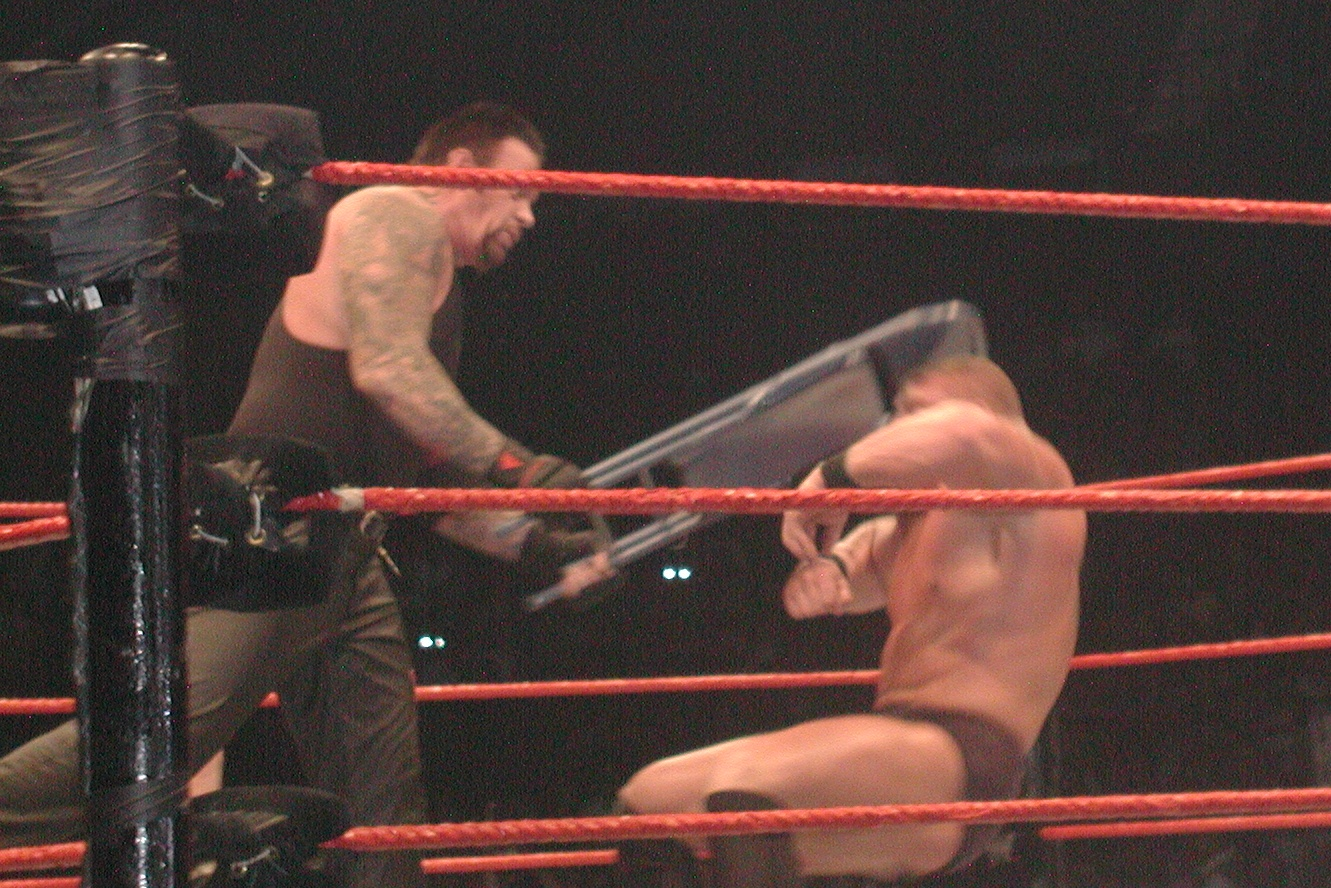
Chair shots to the head were discontinued by the WWE in order to prevent concussions.

In July 2008, WWE changed its TV parental guidelines rating from TV-14 to TV-PG. In December 2008, at a UBS Media Conference, McMahon described the new rating as a marketing strategy to attract a young generation of wrestling fans and create loyalty to the brand. Due to the TV-PG rating, chair shots to the head were banned, as well as sex scenes, blood, and vulgar language.

==== Company legacy ====
During the 1980s, the WWF successfully overcame considerable opposition and some media ridicule in lobbying for deregulation in Connecticut, Delaware, Michigan, New Jersey, California, Florida, Pennsylvania, and Texas. By 2000, fewer than half of the 50 states had athletic regulations on the wrestling industry.

Following common practice in professional sports, WWE classifies its wrestlers as independent contractors rather than employees. The classification allowed the company to avoid paying Social Security, Medicare and unemployment insurance for wrestlers. McMahon stated the WWE wrestlers had lucrative contracts, merchandising deals, royalty payments, and appearance fees. She noted that many of the wrestlers had agents and considered them to be on par with "singers, golfers, or tennis players". The company offered seminars to help wrestlers select health insurance plans.

Under McMahon's tenure, WWE became one of the largest recipients of special tax credits for film and TV production granted by the state of Connecticut.

During her 2010 campaign, Blumenthal's campaign criticized her and WWE for accepting the tax credits while laying off workers in 2009.

=== On-screen roles ===
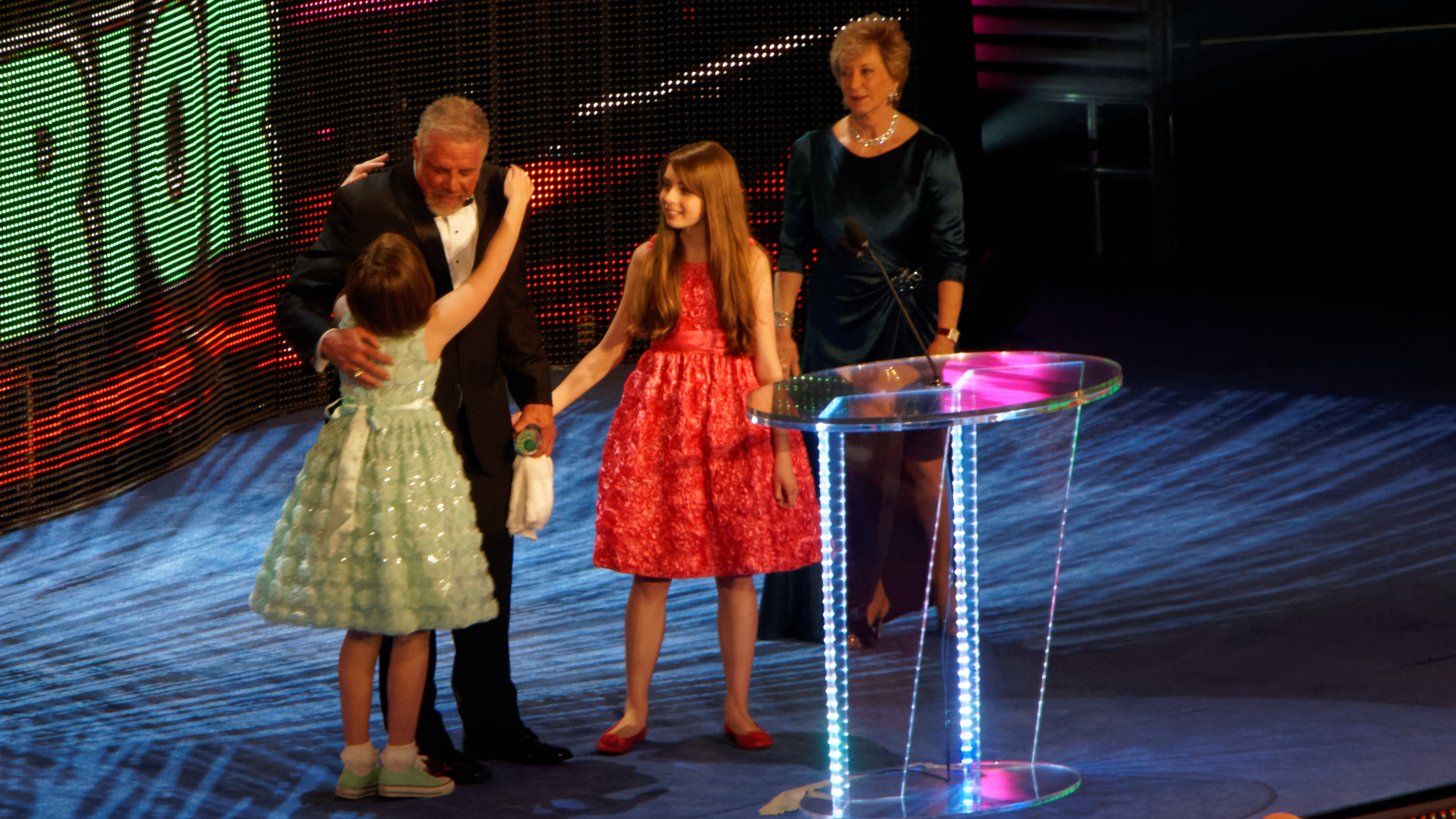
McMahon at the WWE Hall of Fame induction of Ultimate Warrior, April 5, 2014

McMahon often referred to the creative side of WWE as Vince's specialty, stating that she was primarily in the management team, although she appeared in several storylines. McMahon debuted on WWF TV during the Corporate Ministry storyline, on the May 3, 1999, episode of Raw during the Attitude Era. During an interview with Fox News, she said that she often did not know what the storylines were in advance and watched events unfold as the general public did.

=== Charitable work through WWE ===
==== Donations and achievements ====
Through WWE, the McMahons were major donors to the Donald J. Trump Foundation, giving $4 million in 2007 and $5 million in 2009. The McMahons donated over $8 million in 2008 to the Fishburne Military School, Sacred Heart University, and East Carolina University. Nonprofit Quarterly noted the McMahons' donations emphasized capital expenditures. In 2006, they paid $2.5 million for construction of a tennis facility in Ebensburg, Pennsylvania. As of 2010, she served on the board of the Close Up Foundation, a nonprofit which offers youth field trips to Washington, D.C.

McMahon became a member of the board of trustees of Sacred Heart University in Fairfield, Connecticut, in November 2004. She supported many organizations, including the USO, the Make-A-Wish Foundation, the Multiple Myeloma Research Foundation, the Starlight Foundation, and Community Mayors. In 2005, she won appointment to The Make-A-Wish Foundation of America National Advisory Council and received the Arthur M. Sackler Award from the Connecticut Grand Opera and Orchestra for WWE's support of its arts education program.

On January 29, 2007, Multichannel News named McMahon to its class of "Wonder Women" for 2007. The award recognized her outstanding contributions to the cable and telecommunications industries. In May 2007, she appeared as the keynote speaker at the Girl Scout Council of Southwestern Connecticut's Women of Achievement Leadership Breakfast. McMahon was a Girl Scout.

Under her leadership, WWE was the recipient of the USO of Metropolitan Washington's first ever "Legacy of Hope" award for its extensive support of U.S. troops and the USO's Operation Care Package program. In 2007, the company received the Secretary of Defense Exceptional Public Service Award for its support of deployed service members in Iraq and Afghanistan. In 2008, the company received the GI Film Festival's Corporate Patriot Award.

On April 13, 2012, Sacred Heart University officially dedicated and opened the Linda E. McMahon Commons Building on its main campus in Fairfield, Connecticut.

==== Get R.E.A.L. ====
McMahon launched the company's Get R.E.A.L. program to deliver positive messages about education to young adults. The program encouraged literacy through public service announcements, posters, and bookmarks featuring wrestling superstars. In 2000, the American Library Association reported the WWF's Know Your Role poster was its highest-selling poster for two straight months. Since 2006, thousands of posters featuring WWE superstars have been distributed to libraries and reading facilities.

==== SmackDown! Your Vote campaign ====
McMahon initiated WWE's non-partisan voter registration campaign, "SmackDown! Your Vote", in August 2000. The campaign targeted the 18-to-30 voter demographic, and made use of online marketing, public service announcements, and youth voting partnerships. The campaign, which registered 150,000 new voters during the 2000 election, was started in coalition with MTV's Choose or Lose, Project Vote Smart, and Youth Vote 2000. As of the 2008 election, it listed 14 voter registration partner organizations. During the 2008 presidential election, Smackdown your Vote! registered many voters online, often in affiliation with Rock the Vote.

==== Special Olympics ====
The McMahons began supporting the Special Olympics in 1986. McMahon first developed an interest in the Olympics from her friendship with NBC producer Dick Ebersol and Susan Saint James, who encouraged them to participate in the mid-1980s.

She met Lowell Weicker, whose son is developmentally-disabled, through the Special Olympics. In 1995, as Connecticut Governor, Weicker appointed Linda McMahon to the Governor's Council for the World Special Olympics.

=== Sexual abuse lawsuit ===
In October 2024, McMahon was named as a defendant in a lawsuit accusing her, her husband, and the WWE of negligence regarding the ring boy scandal, in which multiple WWE personnel, including ring announcer Mel Phillips and executives Pat Patterson and Terry Garvin, either resigned or were dismissed in 1992 after being accused of sexually assaulting young boys. The lawsuit alleged that the McMahons fostered a culture of sexual abuse within the WWE. The lawsuit was paused by a federal judge in December 2024, pending the outcome of a legal challenge to a state law that could impact the case. The lawsuit was allowed to proceed in February 2025; in April 2025, McMahon filed a motion to dismiss the lawsuit. She has denied the claims in the lawsuit.

== Political career ==
=== Connecticut Board of Education ===
McMahon was appointed to the Connecticut State Board of Education by Governor Jodi Rell in January 2009.

McMahon also sat on the Connecticut Board of Education for one year starting in 2009. She told lawmakers at the time that she had a lifelong interest in education and once planned to become a teacher. She filled out a vetting questionnaire for the board position stating that she had a degree in education from East Carolina University in 1969, although her degree was actually in French.

She went through a confirmation process in the Connecticut State Assembly where she was questioned on her record as CEO of WWE. The State Senate approved her nomination by a vote of 34–1 and the House by 96–45 with some opponents expressing concerns that the nature of her WWE activities would send the wrong message. State representative Bruce Morris claimed she lacked "depth of knowledge regarding education". However, state representative John Hetherington said it "would be good to have someone outside the establishment on the board".

On April 1, 2010, McMahon resigned from the State Board of Education in response to a state election commission's legal opinion that disallowed board members from soliciting campaign contributions. McMahon had entered the race for U.S. Senate months earlier.

=== Campaigns for Senate ===
==== 2010 U.S. Senate campaign ====
Linda McMahon for Senate 2010
- Campaign: U.S. Senator from Connecticut
- Candidate: Linda McMahon
- Affiliation: Republican Party
- Status: Conceded
- Headquarters: West Hartford, Connecticut
- Key people: Ed Patru (spokesman)
- Receipts: US$46.6 million
- Slogan(s): A businesswoman, not a politician, for Connecticut

On September 16, 2009, McMahon announced her candidacy for U.S. senator to represent the state of Connecticut. She announced she would spend up to $50 million of her own money to finance her campaign and refused outside donations, the third most ever spent on a senatorial campaign. She ran for the Republican nomination, campaigning on promises of lower taxes, fiscal conservatism, and job creation. She campaigned as socially moderate, and identified herself as pro-choice while also opposing partial-birth abortion and federal funding for abortions.

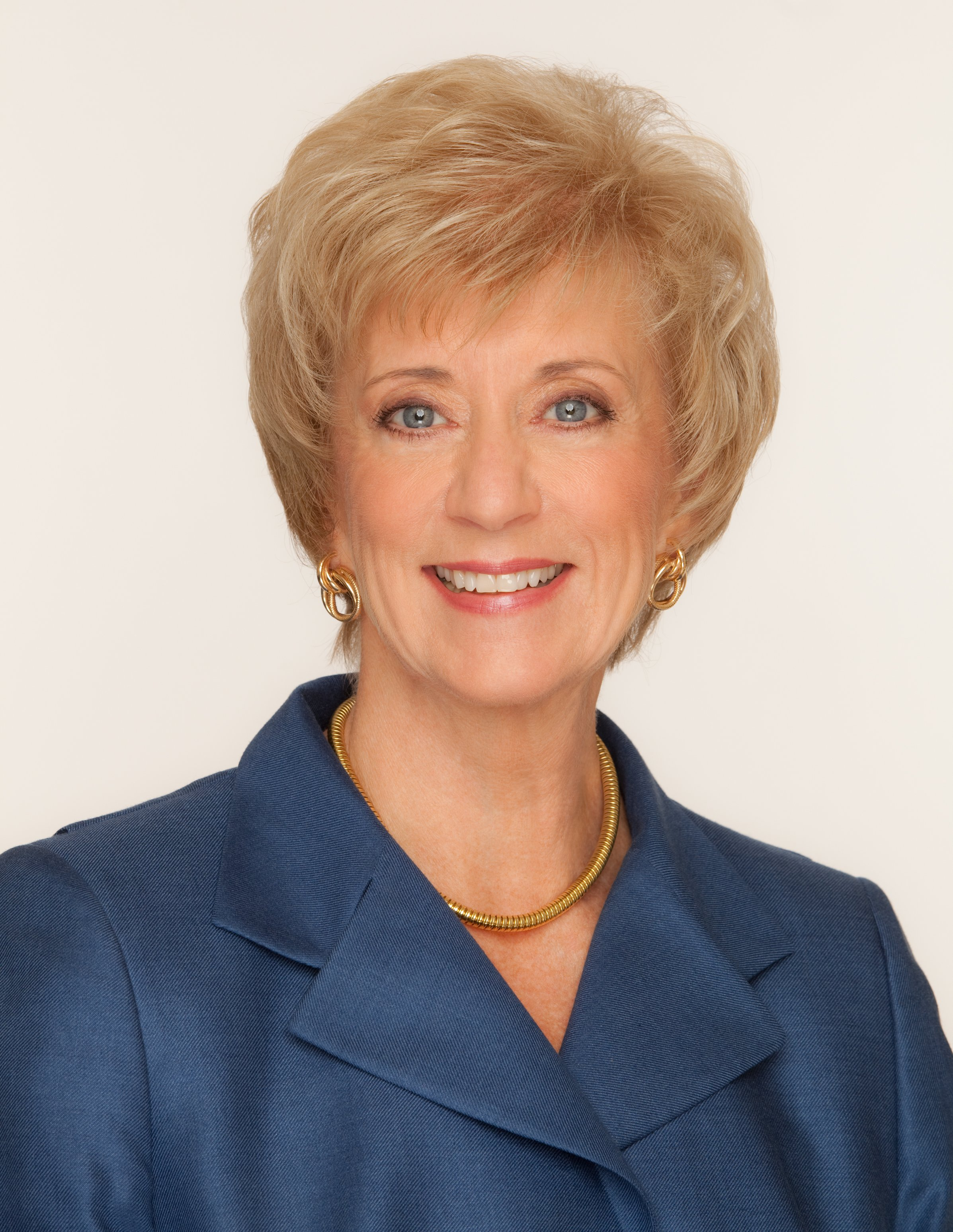
McMahon in 2014

McMahon's spending became a key argument of one of her Republican primary rivals, former congressman Rob Simmons, who accused her of "buying the election". McMahon and Simmons engaged in a frequently bitter contest. At the party convention, McMahon received the most support, but Simmons received enough votes to qualify for the ballot for the August 10 primary, although he was not actively campaigning. In late July—two weeks before the primary—Simmons relaunched his campaign by airing ads on TV, reminding voters that his name would be on the ballot, participating in debates, and accepting interviews with editorial boards. A third candidate, Peter Schiff, qualified for the ballot by submitting petition signatures. McMahon defeated her opponents and faced Richard Blumenthal in the general election, losing by 11.8 percentage points.

==== 2012 U.S. Senate campaign ====
Immediately after her loss to Blumenthal, McMahon hinted she would run again for Senate in 2012. McMahon maintained a high profile following the election, running television ads, campaigning for politicians, and making frequent media appearances. When Joe Lieberman announced he would retire from the U.S. Senate, she became the Republican Party favorite for the 2012 election.

On September 20, 2011, in Southington, Connecticut, McMahon officially announced her candidacy. On May 18, 2012, McMahon earned the endorsement of the state Republican Party at the Connecticut State Republican Convention by a delegate vote of 658 to 351 over the next-highest candidate, former congressman Chris Shays. The two were the only candidates to qualify for the primary, which took place on August 14, 2012. McMahon defeated Shays by a three-to-one margin, spending $15.7 million of her money on the campaign. She lost to Democratic U.S. representative Chris Murphy in the general election, marking her second consecutive defeat.

=== Political contributions ===
Following her election defeats, McMahon committed herself to becoming a major Republican fundraiser and donor. She donated to groups such as American Crossroads and Ending Spending Fund, and associated with fellow Republican donor Paul Singer.

As the 2016 Republican nomination process began to gear up in early 2015, McMahon, Singer, and Charles R. Schwab were among donors and prospective political candidates who attended a daylong meeting near Jackson, Wyoming, that was hosted by TD Ameritrade founder Joe Ricketts and his son Todd, and featured "several Republican donors who favor[ed] same-sex marriage and immigration reform".

After Donald Trump made an appearance at WrestleMania 23 in 2007, the McMahons donated $5 million to the Donald J. Trump Foundation in addition to the payment for the appearance. In 2016, McMahon donated $6 million to Rebuilding America Now, a Super PAC with the purpose of electing Trump as U.S. president, and in 2015 and 2016 combined, $1.2 million to Future 45, a Super PAC which funded anti-Bernie Sanders advertisements.

== Administrator of the Small Business Administration (2017–2019) ==
=== Nomination and confirmation ===
On December 7, 2016, President-elect Donald Trump announced his intention to nominate McMahon to serve as administrator of the Small Business Administration (SBA).

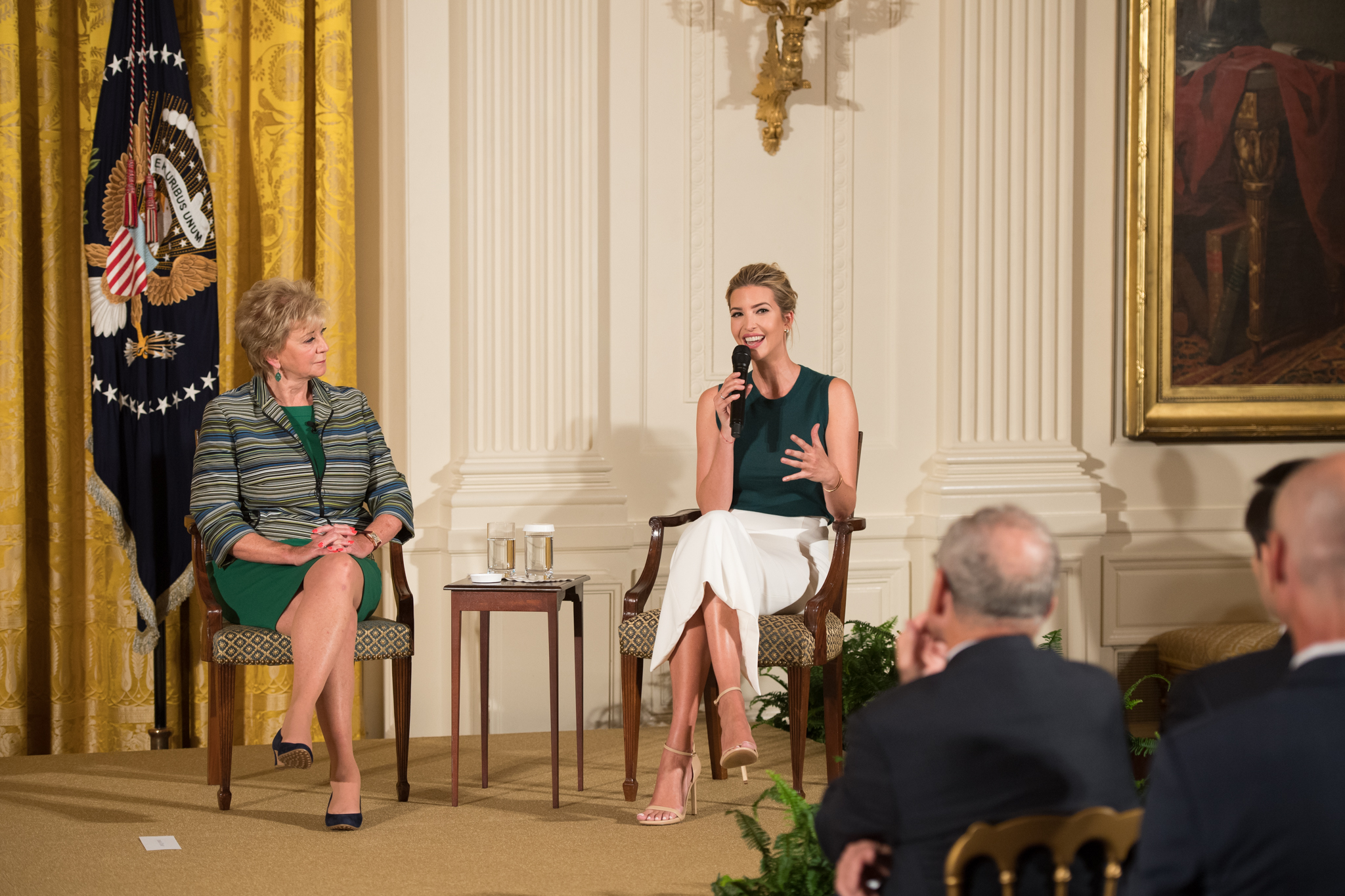
McMahon sits alongside Ivanka Trump, August 1, 2017.

McMahon's confirmation hearing occurred on January 24, 2017. Her nomination was approved by the Senate Committee on Small Business and Entrepreneurship on February 1, 2017 with an 18–1 vote. McMahon was confirmed by the U.S. Senate on February 14, 2017 by a bipartisan vote of 81–19.

=== Tenure ===
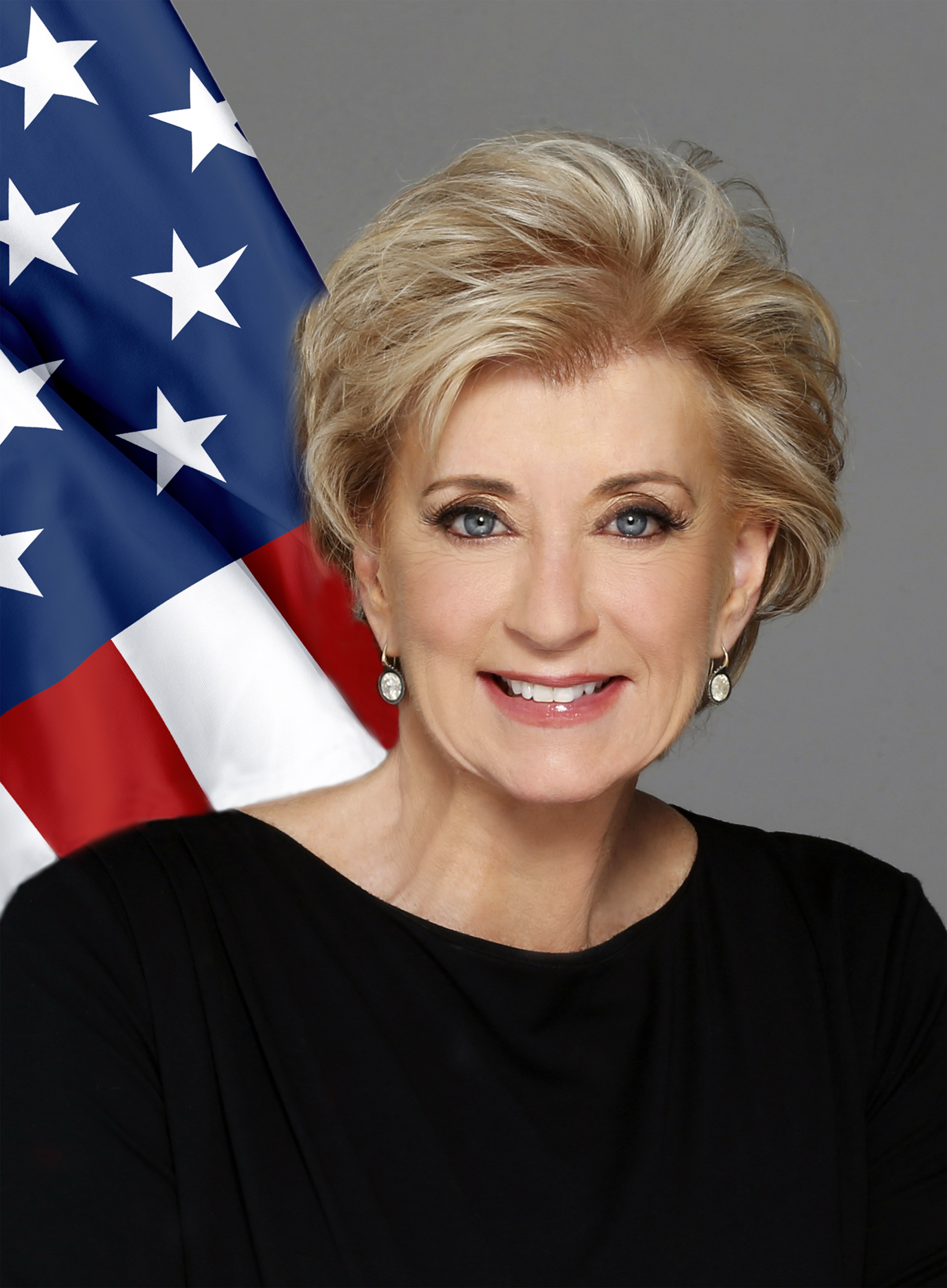
Official portrait, 2017

McMahon was officially sworn in as the 25th Administrator of the Small Business Administration on February 14, 2017.

Throughout 2017, McMahon visited 68 cities to hear from small business owners and to support the Tax Cuts and Jobs Act of 2017 backed by President Trump. On McMahon's first anniversary as head of the SBA, on January 29, 2018, The Washington Post said the SBA's progress under McMahon had been "so far, so good" and credited her with improving the SBA's offices' emergency call centers in the aftermath of Hurricane Harvey, hiring an additional 3,000 people to work them, and revamping the administration's online presence.

On June 17, 2017, in an interview with CNBC, McMahon stated that in her role as administrator of SBA she was "[l]earning how to develop business plans, how to grow, how to pitch [one's] business when [one is] trying to get investors, or to move into a different market and those are aspects of SBA that are not as well known", as the main goals of the SBA were capital, counseling, contracts and disaster relief. She also stated that the goals were being challenged, as the agency faced a five percent budget cut and future restructuring. "What we have done is look inside SBA, and what I have found is there are some duplicative programs that we are going to be merging."

On March 29, 2019, McMahon announced her departure from the SBA (effective on April 12, 2019) to work for President Trump's 2020 reelection efforts. McMahon went on to become the founding chairperson of the America First Policy Institute.

== Fundraising and second Trump transition (2019–2025) ==
America First Action, a pro-Trump Super PAC chaired by McMahon, helped raise $83 million for Trump's reelection campaign in 2020. McMahon also serves as chair of the board for the America First Policy Institute, along with vice chair Larry Kudlow, former director of the National Economic Council under Trump and Fox Business host. McMahon went on to join Howard Lutnick as co-chair of Trump's second transition team.

== Secretary of Education (2025–present) ==
=== Nomination and confirmation ===
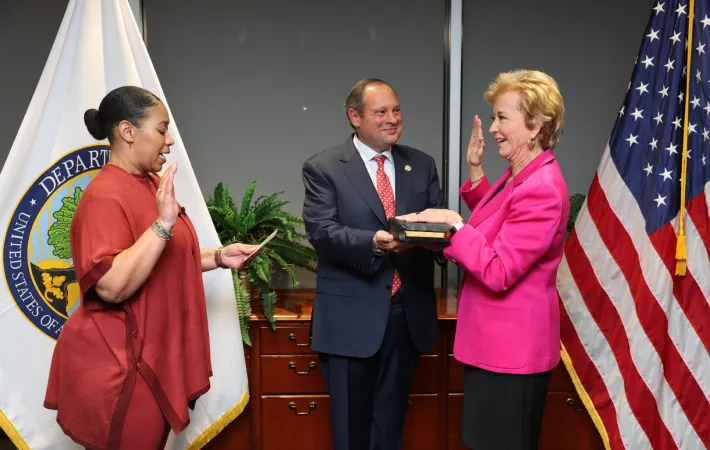
McMahon being sworn in by Jacqueline Clay

On November 19, 2024, President-elect Donald Trump announced the nomination of McMahon to head the Department of Education for his second administration.

Throughout her nomination process, McMahon expressed support for school choice and charter schools in the United States.

On January 20, 2025, McMahon's nomination was received in the U.S. Senate and referred to the Senate Committee on Health, Education, Labor, and Pensions (HELP). The nomination hearing was scheduled for February 13, 2025. The committee advanced her nomination in a 12–11 vote on February 20. On March 3, 2025, the U.S. Senate confirmed McMahon as United States secretary of education with a 51–45 vote.

=== Tenure ===
Before her confirmation Trump emphasized that McMahon's primary objective would be to close the Department of Education, stating, "I want her to put herself out of a job." McMahon echoed Trump's comments, stating that the department was not needed when asked directly if the United States needed the department.

McMahon was sworn in by Jacqueline Clay as the 13th United States Secretary of Education on March 3, 2025.

On March 11, the department announced the layoff of half of its workforce. The actions were challenged in court, with a coalition of groups led by Democracy Forward arguing that the changes to the department would require action by Congress. Lower courts enjoined the action, but in July 2025, the Supreme Court permitted the layoffs to proceed.

McMahon has oversight over the America 250 Civics Education Coalition, a partnership of conservative organizations who are creating civics programming around the 250th anniversary of the United States. The coalition is led by the America First Policy Institute, which formerly employed McMahon. McMahon signed an ethics waiver allowing her to participate, acknowledging her conflict of interest as a former AFPI employee.

== Electoral history ==
Primary

Republican United States Senatorial primary election in Connecticut, 2010
Party	Candidate	Votes	%
Republican	Linda E. McMahon	60,479	49
Republican	Rob Simmons	34,011	28
Republican	Peter Schiff	27,831	23
Total votes		122,321	100

United States Senate election in Connecticut, 2010
Party	Candidate	Votes	%	±%
Democratic	Richard Blumenthal	605,204	52.48%	–13.88%
Working Families	Richard Blumenthal	30,836	2.68%	N/A
Total	Richard Blumenthal	636,040	55.16%	-11.20%
Republican	Linda E. McMahon	498,341	43.22%	+11.08%
Independent	Warren B. Mosler	11,275	0.98%	N/A
Connecticut for Lieberman	John Mertens	6,735	0.58%	N/A
Write-in		724	0.06%	N/A
Total votes		1,153,115	100.0%	

Republican United States Senatorial primary election in Connecticut, 2012
Party	Candidate	Votes	%
Republican	Linda E. McMahon	83,413	73
Republican	Chris Shays	31,305	27
Total votes		114,718	100

United States Senate election in Connecticut, 2012
Party	Candidate	Votes	%	±%
Democratic	Chris Murphy	792,983	52.45%	+12.72%
Working Families	Chris Murphy	35,778	2.37%	N/A
Total	Chris Murphy	828,761	54.82%	+15.09%
Republican	Linda McMahon	604,569	39.99%	+30.37%
Independent Party	Linda McMahon	46,520	3.08%	N/A
Total	Linda McMahon	651,089	43.07%	+33.45%
Libertarian	Paul Passarelli	25,045	1.66%	N/A
Write-in		6,869	0.45%	+0.45%
Total votes		1,511,764	100.00%	N/A

Business positions
Preceded by Vince McMahon	President of WWF; 1993–2000	Succeeded by Stuart Snyder
Preceded by Vince McMahon	CEO of WWF/E; 1997–2009	Succeeded by Vince McMahon
Party political offices
Preceded by Jack Orchulli	Republican nominee for U.S. Senator from Connecticut (Class 3); 2010	Succeeded by Dan Carter
Preceded by Alan Schlesinger	Republican nominee for U.S. Senator from Connecticut (Class 1); 2012	Succeeded by Matthew Corey
Political offices
Preceded by Maria Contreras-Sweet	Administrator of the Small Business Administration; 2017–2019	Succeeded by Jovita Carranza
Preceded by Miguel Cardona	United States Secretary of Education; 2025–present	Incumbent
Order of precedence
Preceded by Chris Wright as United States Secretary of Energy	Order of precedence of the United States as Secretary of Education	Succeeded by Doug Collins as United States Secretary of Veterans Affairs
U.S. presidential line of succession
Preceded by Chris Wright as United States Secretary of Energy	Sixteenth in line as Secretary of Education	Succeeded by Doug Collins as United States Secretary of Veterans Affairs
