= Paula Bonta =

Argentinian-Canadian computer scientist

- Occupations: Computer scientist, Software designer, Programmer

Paula Bonta is an Argentinian-Canadian computer scientist and educational software designer. She is known for developing programming environments for children, most notably contributing to the design of the Scratch programming language before it was even called Scratch. She co-founded the Playful Invention Company, a spin-off from the MIT Media Lab noted for developing the Programmable Cricket, with Mitchel Resnick and Brian Silverman and serves as Lead Designer. She was also the design director for several award-winning software products for children, including MicroWorlds and the "My Make Believe" series of products from Logo Computer Systems, Inc. She has a degree in computer science and a graduate degree from the Harvard Graduate School of Education.
