= Programmable Cricket =

Robotic toy

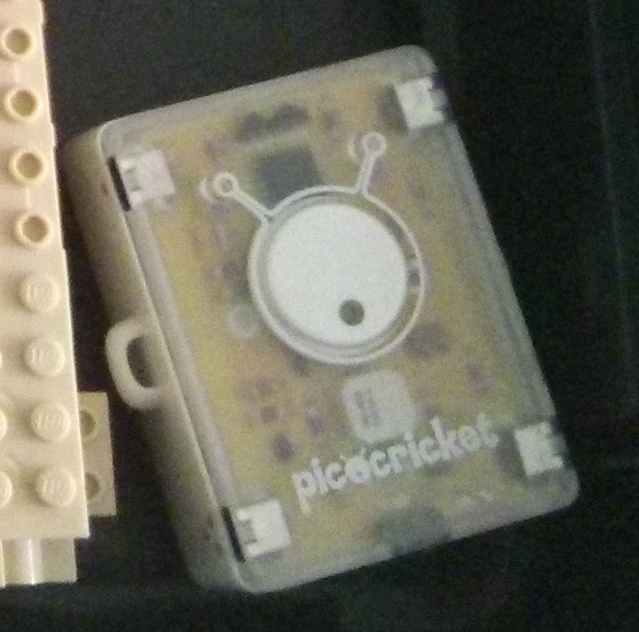
A PicoCricket

Programmable Crickets, known commercially as PicoCrickets, are robotic toys in the form of programmable bricks. They are used to construct artistic projects.

Crickets were developed at MIT Media Lab, and were launched commercially in Montreal in 2006.

Playful Invention Company (PICO), co-founded by Mitchel Resnick, Brian Silverman and Paula Bonta, was formed with financial support from Lego Group, the Danish construction toy manufacturer, to commercialize the toy. As of 2008, PICO also markets a toy for use with the Scratch programming language, another MIT Media Lab development.
