= America First Policy Institute =

U.S. advocacy organization

- Founded: 2021; 5 years ago
- Founder: Brooke Rollins; Larry Kudlow
- Tax ID no.: 85-4202763
- Legal status: 501(c)(3)
- President and CEO: Greg Sindelar
- Key people: Larry Kudlow (chairman)
- Revenue: $51.4 million (2024)
- Expenses: $37.9 million (2024)
- Employees: 150 (2022)
- Website: americafirstpolicy.com

The America First Policy Institute (AFPI) is a 501(c)(3) nonprofit conservative think tank that was founded in 2021 to promote an America First public policy agenda. Greg Sindelar became the organization's interim president and CEO in March 2025.

AFPI was founded by Brooke Rollins, who served as president and CEO and who serves as Secretary of Agriculture under Donald Trump's second administration, and Larry Kudlow, who served as vice chair and formerly served as the director of the National Economic Council under Trump's first administration. The founding chairperson of the organization was Linda McMahon, who formerly served as Administrator of the Small Business Administration under Trump's first administration and currently serves as Secretary of Education under Trump's second administration.

In a March 2026 Politico article highlighting the organization's influence, AFPI president and CEO Greg Sindelar said that "If you look at our America First agenda that we put forth, it had innumerable ideas and policy ideas that we would love to see happen. In fact, I think this administration's already like 90, 91 percent already in some sort of action." He added, "When Trump 2.0… happened, we were able to just start acting on the implementation of those ideas with the various agencies."

== Activities ==
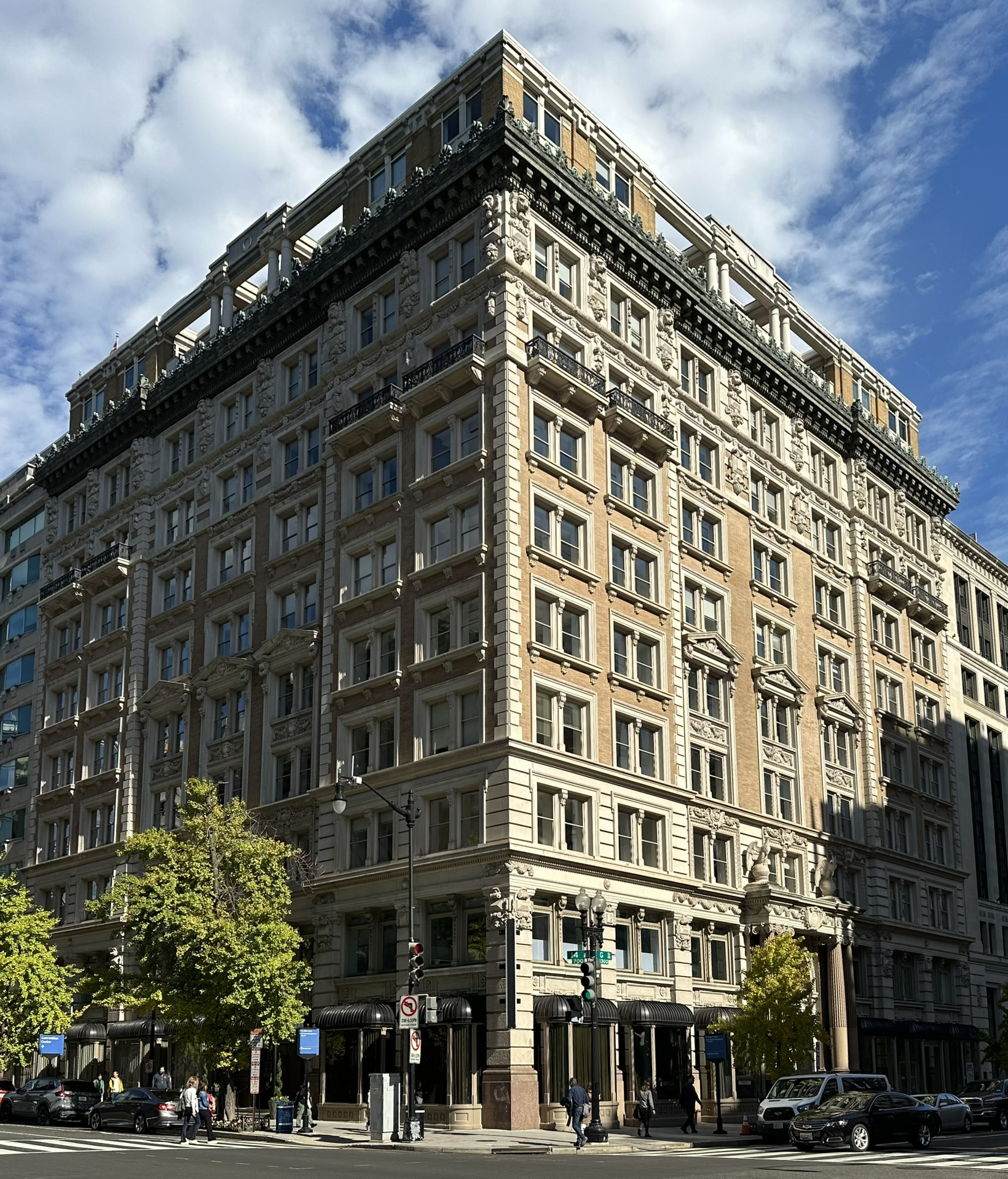
The Colorado Building in Washington, D.C., was purchased by AFPI in January 2026.

According to Politico, prior to Trump regaining the presidency for a 2nd term, AFPI was often described as a "White House in waiting". The group produced a document about its vision, which includes "job creation and low unemployment, expansion of affordable housing, eradicating COVID-19, reducing federal bureaucracy, cracking down on crime and illegal immigration, passing congressional term limits, and ending foreign war and reliance on China." As of 2023, AFPI had 172 employees, including eight former cabinet secretaries from the Trump administration.

AFPI sponsored a transition project, which was viewed as a rival to Heritage Foundation's Project 2025.

In September 2025, the Trump administration announced that AFPI would lead the America 250 Civics Education Coalition, with oversight from the Department of Education. The coalition is made up of more than 40 conservative organizations and will develop civics education programming to celebrate the 250th anniversary of the United States.

In January 2026, AFPI purchased the Colorado Building at 1341 G Street NW as its new headquarters in Washington, D.C., paying $20 million for the building.

== Role in second Trump administration ==
At its annual policy summit in May 2025, the organization announced that of the 196 federal policies they had drafted and recommended in 2022, over 86% had been "advanced or enacted" during the first one hundred days of the second Trump administration. The organization also said that 73 of its alumni had been hired by the Trump administration. In addition to Brooke Rollins and Linda McMahon, the list of those formerly associated with AFPI now working in the Trump administration includes Pam Bondi, Doug Collins, Lee Zeldin, Scott Turner, John Ratcliffe, Kash Patel, and Kevin Hassett.

According to DeSmog, in mid-December 2024, "Trump's cabinet picks so far have more direct links to AFPI than any other organization."

Linda McMahon has oversight over the AFPI-led America 250 Civics Education Coalition, in her current capacity as education secretary. The New York Times reported that McMahon signed an ethics waiver allowing her to participate, acknowledging her conflict of interest as a former AFPI employee.

== Policy positions ==
According to New York Times reporter Ken Bensinger, key policy proposals from the AFPI's policy book, The America First Agenda, include eliminating most civil service protections for federal employees, allowing summary dismissals without appeal; expanding domestic oil and gas production by opening up new federal lands for fast-tracked petroleum exploration and drilling, and resumed construction of the Keystone pipeline; imposing supervised ultrasound requirements and mandatory waiting periods before abortions, as well as ending federal funding for organizations like Planned Parenthood; opposing red flag laws that restrict gun ownership for high-risk individuals; and supporting nationwide reciprocity for concealed carry permits, enabling a permit from any state to authorize concealed carry across all 50 states. Other policy proposals include imposing tariffs on imports, reducing corporate taxes, rolling back climate change initiatives and getting out of the Paris climate agreement, opposing the transgender transition of children, adding work requirements for Medicaid and limiting U.S. involvement in global conflicts. It proposes restricting immigration by completing the U.S.-Mexico border wall, boosting funding for border agents, and ending legal immigration programs such as family-based visas and the visa lottery.

== Funding ==
In 2022, AFPI brought in $23.6 million in revenue. The group had revenue of $27.3 million in 2023. As a 501(c)(3) nonprofit organization, AFPI is not required to disclose its donors. Trump has hosted fundraisers for the group and his Save America PAC has donated $1 million to the institute.

== Board members ==
AFPI's board members as of 2024 were Linda McMahon (chair), Larry Kudlow (vice chair), Tim Dunn, Bob Unanue, Trish Duggan, Cody Campbell, Mark Pentecost, Newt Gingrich, Kevin Hassett, and David Herche.
