= Gary Cohn =

American businessman & politician (born 1960)

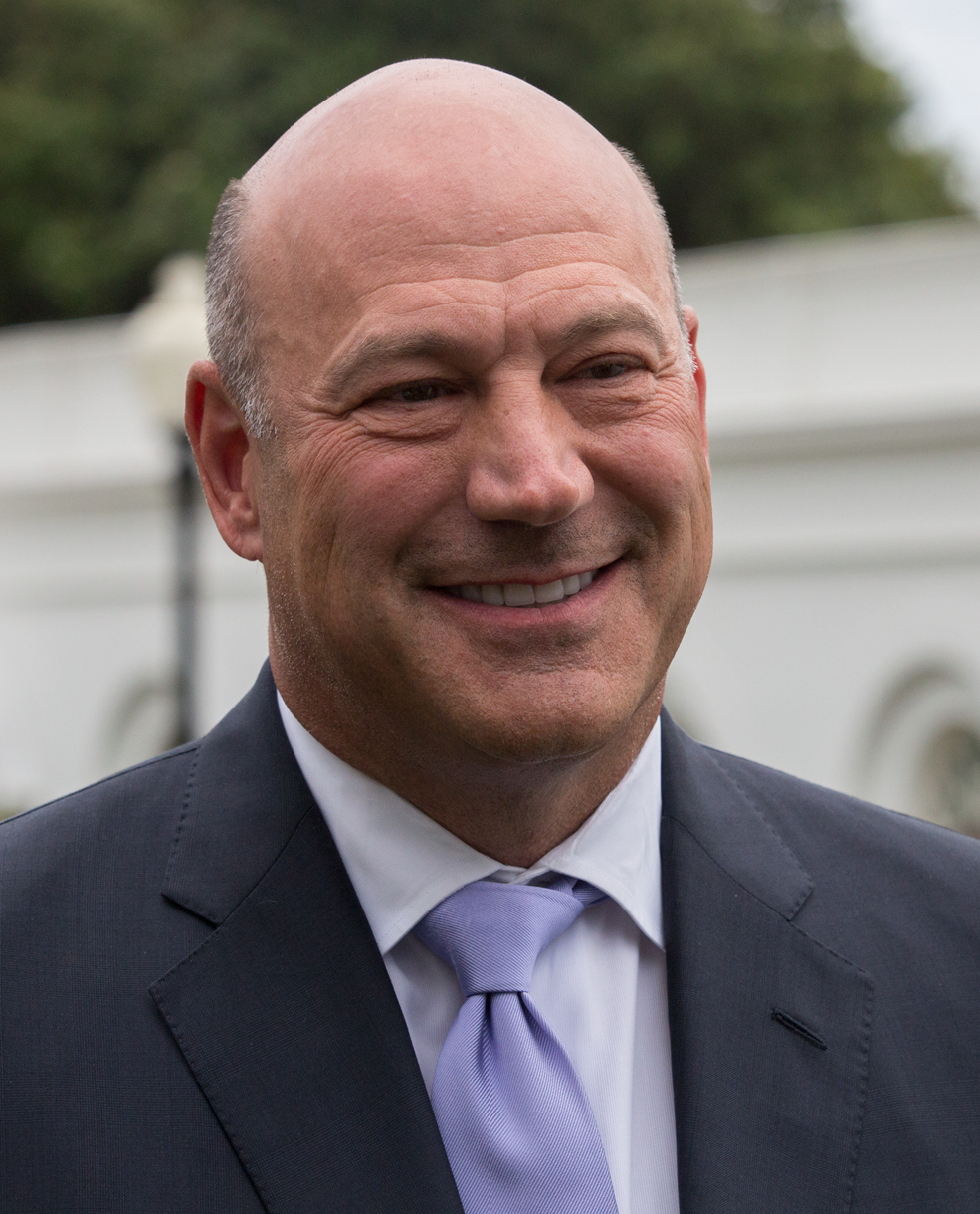

11th Director of the National Economic Council
- In office January 20, 2017 – April 2, 2018
- President: Donald Trump
- Preceded by: Jeff Zients
- Succeeded by: Larry Kudlow

Personal details
- Born: Gary David Cohn; August 27, 1960 (age 66) Cleveland, Ohio, U.S.
- Party: Democratic
- Spouse: Lisa Pevaroff (m. 1986)
- Children: 3
- Education: American University (BS)
- Website: garydcohn.com

Gary David Cohn (born August 27, 1960) is an American businessman and philanthropist who served as the 11th director of the National Economic Council and chief economic advisor to President Donald Trump from 2017 to 2018. He managed the administration's economic policy agenda. Before serving in the White House, Cohn was president and COO of Goldman Sachs, where he worked for more than 25 years. Cohn was appointed vice-chairman of IBM on January 5, 2021.

Following his White House service, Cohn became an advisor and venture capital investor for companies operating in the cybersecurity, blockchain infrastructure, and medical technology sectors. He is on the Board of Advisors for Hoyos Integrity, a startup company employing biometric blockchain technology for secure communications and digital payments, and vice chairman of IBM. Cohn is also the chairman of the advisory board at Pallas Advisors, a national security strategic advisory firm based in Washington, D.C.

== Early life and education ==
Gary Cohn was born to an Eastern European Jewish family, the son of Victor and Ellen Cohn, and was raised in Shaker Heights, Ohio. His father was an electrician who later became a real estate developer. Cohn was diagnosed with dyslexia at a young age, and attended four schools by the time he reached sixth grade. His childhood experiences with dyslexia were a featured case study in the book David and Goliath by Canadian journalist Malcolm Gladwell. Cohn studied at Gilmour Academy for high school and graduated in 1979.

Cohn received a Bachelor of Science degree with a major in business administration from American University in 1982.

== Career ==
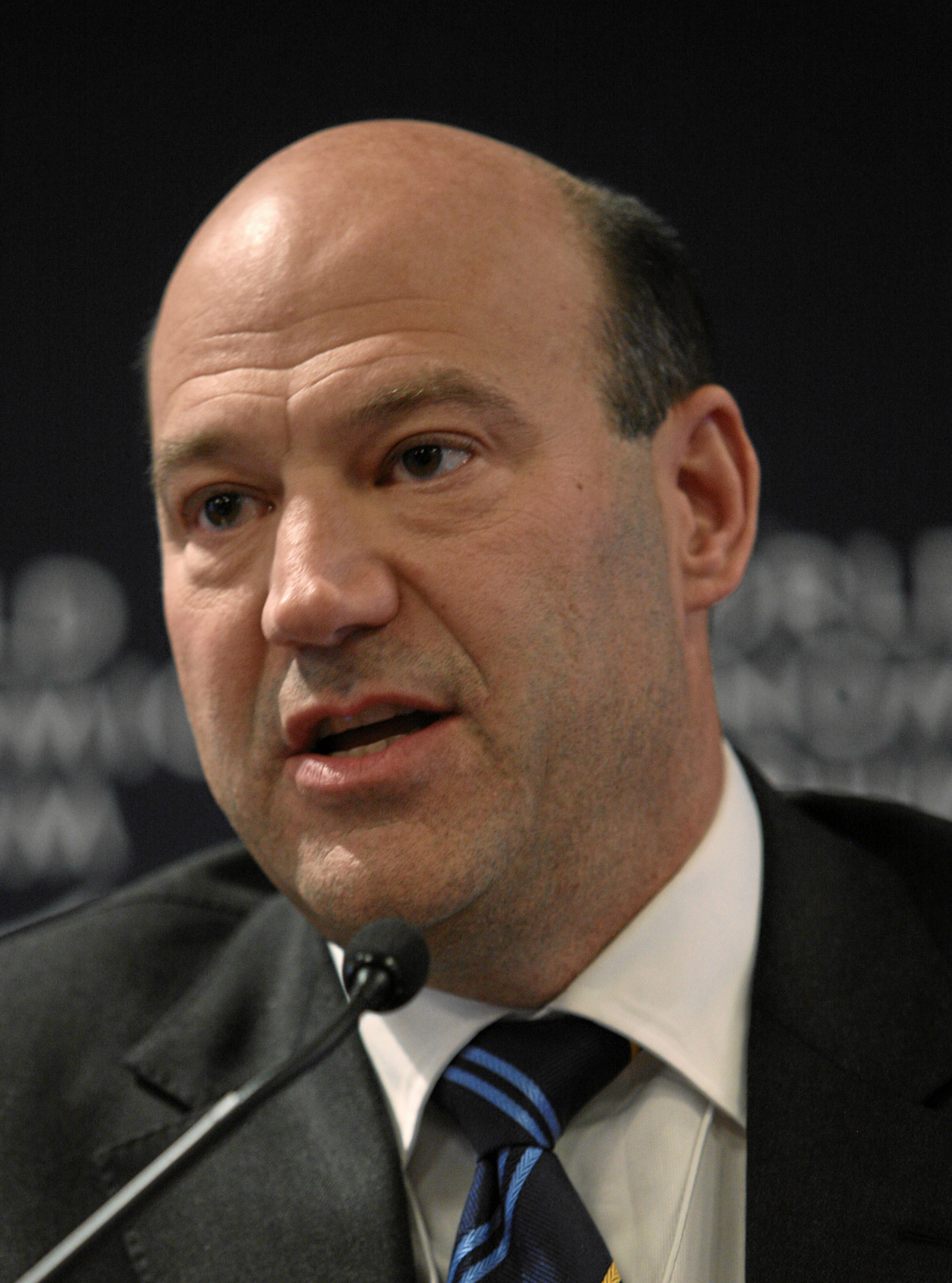
Cohn at the World Economic Forum Annual Meeting in 2010

Cohn started his career at the U.S. Steel home products division in Cleveland, Ohio. After a few months, he left U.S. Steel and became an options dealer in the New York Mercantile Exchange. He taught himself the basics of options by reading about it in the days between meeting the hiring manager and joining the New York Mercantile Exchange.

Cohn was hired by Goldman Sachs in 1990 and became a partner at the firm in 1994. In 1996, he was named head of the commodities department, and in 2002, he was named the head of the Fixed Income, Currency and Commodities (FICC) division. In 2003, he was named co-head of Equities, and in January 2004, Cohn was named the co-head of global securities businesses. He became president and Co-Chief Operating Officer, and director in June 2006. While at Goldman Sachs, Cohn was also a member of the firm's board of directors and Chairman of the Firmwide Client and Business Standards Committee.

In 2010, Cohn testified to Congress on Goldman Sachs' role in the 2008 financial crisis. He testified: "During the two years of the financial crisis, Goldman Sachs lost $1.2 billion in its residential mortgage-related business. We did not 'bet against our clients', and the numbers underscore this fact."

On January 5, 2021, Cohn was appointed Vice Chairman of IBM's board of directors.

== National Economic Council Director ==
On January 20, 2017, Cohn took office as Director of the National Economic Council (NEC) in President Donald Trump's administration, a position that did not require Congressional confirmation. By February 11, 2017, The Wall Street Journal described Cohn as an "economic-policy powerhouse", and The New York Times called him Trump's "go-to figure on matters related to jobs, business, and growth". With the confirmation of Trump's nominee for Secretary of Treasury, Steven Mnuchin, pending in the Senate, Cohn filled in the "personnel vacuum" and pushed "ahead on taxes, infrastructure, financial regulation, and replacing health-care law". In addition to his $285 million Goldman Sachs severance package, Cohn also sold a stake in the Industrial and Commercial Bank of China, the world's largest bank (as of 2017), then valued at $16 million.

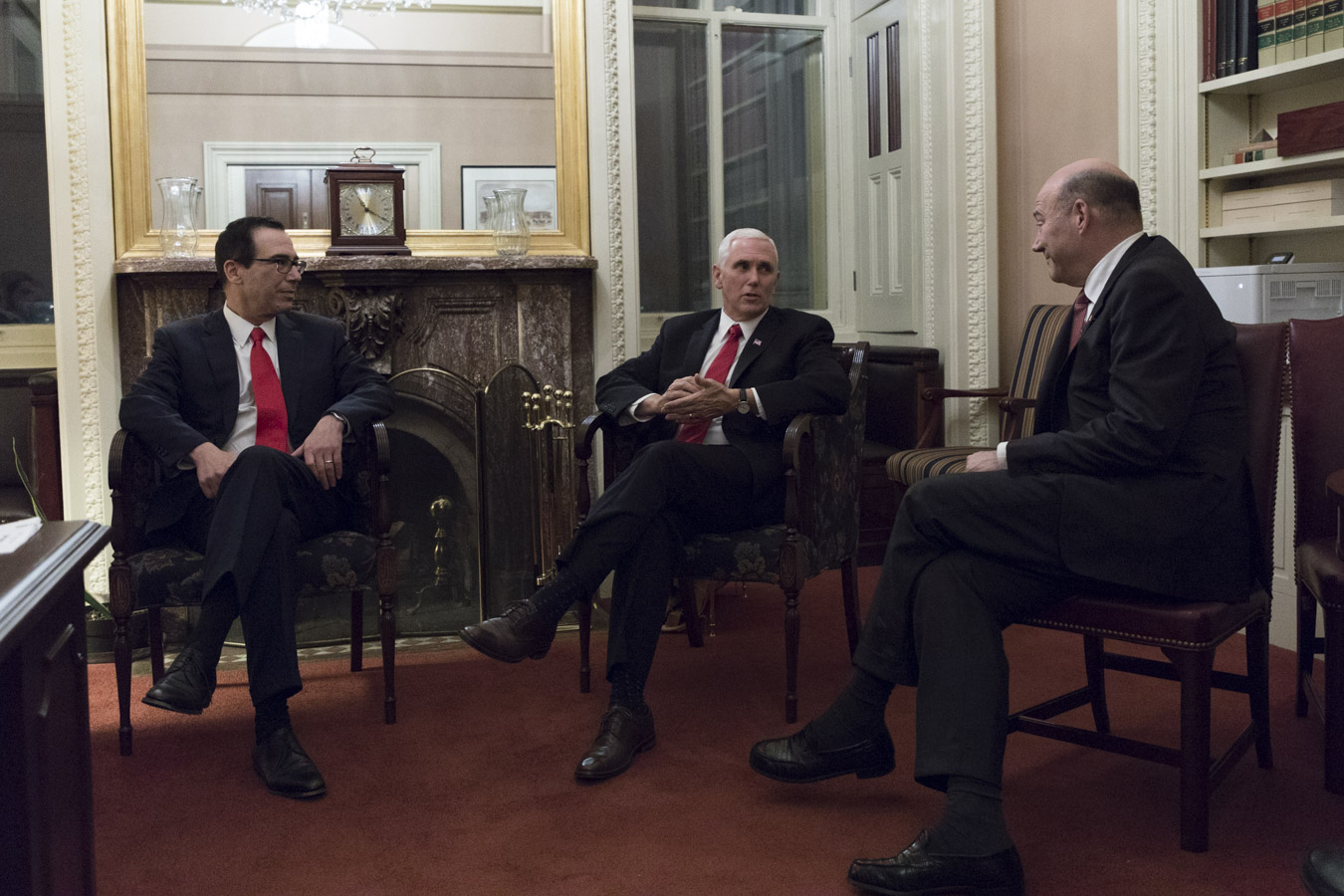
Vice President Mike Pence, Gary Cohn, and Steve Mnuchin watch tax reform vote.

Cohn supports reinstating the Glass-Steagall legislation, which would separate commercial and investment banking.

Under the Trump administration, Cohn was cited by the press as a supporter of globalism, and was given nicknames such as "Globalist Gary" and "Carbon Tax Cohn". He, Jared Kushner, Ivanka Trump, and Dina Powell were referred to by opponents as the "Wall Street wing" of the Trump administration. He was said to be at odds with the populist faction led by Steve Bannon, when Bannon was White House Chief Strategist. He was also rivals with trade advisor Peter Navarro, who favored tariffs and was hawkish towards China; Navarro later described Cohn as "one of the worst and most treacherous misfits of the entire Trump administration".

Cohn led the Trump administration's efforts to pass the Tax Cuts and Jobs Act of 2017. In a 2019 article in The Wall Street Journal, Cohn pointed to an increase of $6,000 in real disposable personal income per household, as well as the creation of seven million jobs, as evidence of the success of tax reform.

Cohn reportedly considered resigning from the National Economic Council after the 2017 Charlottesville rally and criticized the Trump administration's response to the rally, saying, "I believe this administration can and must do better in consistently and unequivocally condemning" white supremacists. In August 2020, Jim Sciutto published The Madman Theory, a book in which Cohn said in response to Trump saying that there were "very fine people on both sides" of the protests which included white supremacists, "Citizens standing up for equality and freedom can never be equated with white supremacists, neo-Nazis, and the KKK."

By September 2017, the Office of Trade and Manufacturing Policy had been folded into the National Economic Council, which meant that Navarro would report to Cohn.

On March 6, 2018, Cohn announced his intention to resign; the announcement followed Trump's proposal to impose import tariffs on steel and aluminum and Trump's cancellation of a meeting with end users of steel and aluminum that Cohn had arranged in an attempt to dissuade him from the tariffs. He was replaced by Larry Kudlow on April 2. Cohn's departure solidified the influence of Navarro.

Bob Woodward's 2018 book Fear: Trump in the White House relates two instances when Cohn removed draft letters from Trump's desk so that Trump would not see them. One of the letters would have canceled a key trade agreement with South Korea, and one would have withdrawn the U.S. unilaterally from the NAFTA trade agreement with Canada and Mexico. Trump's opinion of Cohn reportedly remained good after he resigned; Trump called him a "rare talent" who had done a "superb job". Cohn supported other candidates during the 2024 Republican Party presidential primaries, but after Trump won the 2024 United States presidential election, Cohn became a "Trump ambassador" to Wall Street for appointments and policy.

== Venture capital ==
After leaving the White House, Cohn became an advisor and venture capital investor for companies in the cybersecurity, blockchain, and digital payments sectors. He is on the Board of Spring Labs, a startup using blockchain technology to share consumer credit data, and Sotera Digital Security, a company that has created a mobile phone for secure communications. Cohn is also a key advisor for Machine Zone and Abryx, a biomaterial science company. At Sotera Digital, he is involved in the strategy and rollout of a next-generation secure mobile phone aimed at government and corporate customers.

In April 2020, Cohn was appointed to the Risk & Governance Advisory Board of Starling, a technology company in applied behavior sciences.

In August 2020, Cohn and investor Clifton S. Robbins launched Cohn Robbins Holdings Corp.

== Harvard Kennedy School ==
In 2019, Cohn was a visiting fellow at the Institute of Politics at the Harvard Kennedy School where he taught a seminar alongside former U.S. Senator Heidi Heitkamp on economic, demographic, and national security policy. Cohn and Heitkamp focused on structural economic and demographic issues. Spring 2019 Fellows at the Institute included Mayor Andrew Gillum, Rep. Carlos Curbelo, and Mayor Mitch Landrieu.

While at Harvard, Cohn was the lead sponsor for the Road to 2092: Save Social Security, the first policy hackathon organized by the Harvard Institute of Politics. The competition featured over 250 students from 28 universities; the winning team presented its policy brief at the U.S. Capitol and the White House and was featured on MSNBC.

== Personal life ==
Cohn is married to Lisa Pevaroff-Cohn. They have three daughters, and reside in New York City.

=== Philanthropy ===
Cohn and his wife are founding board members of the New York University Child Study Center. The couple funded the Pevaroff Cohn Professorship in Child and Adolescent Psychiatry at the New York University School of Medicine in 1999. He financed the Gary D. Cohn Endowed Goldman Sachs Chair in Finance and the Gary D. Cohn Scholarship both at American University, his alma mater. In 2015 Cohn financed the Gary D. Cohn and Brother Robert LaVelle Endowed Scholarship in honor of Brother Robert LaVelle, who was retiring after 35 years as head of Gilmour Academy, where Cohn attended high school.

In 2009, the Hillel International building at Kent State University was named the Cohn Jewish Student Center in recognition of a gift from Cohn and his wife. It is the first Hillel building built on a state university campus.

Cohn has been a supporter of Reviving Baseball in Inner Cities, and has supported the nonprofit youth development organization Harlem RBI (now called DREAM) since 2011. At that time, Harlem RBI was given the chance to build its own charter school. Mark Teixeira of the New York Yankees and Harlem RBI director Rich Berlin asked Cohn to help them raise the capital they needed to build the school. On June 17, 2013, Cohn was honored at the annual "Bids for Kids" gala in order to raise funds for Harlem RBI. He said in an interview that Harlem RBI is a project "very near and dear to my heart". In 2015, Cohn won $360,000 for Harlem RBI as winner of Bloomberg's Brackets for a Cause competition.

=== Memberships ===
Cohn is active in various charitable causes related to education and healthcare. He is a member of the Board of Trustees of NYU Langone Health and on the Board of Overseers of the NYU Tandon School of Engineering.

In 2010, the Hospital for Joint Diseases at NYU Langone Medical Center named Cohn the chairman of the HJD Advisory Board. Cohn has been a trustee of American University and Gilmour Academy.

Political offices
Preceded by Jeffrey Zients	Director of the National Economic Council; 2017–2018	Succeeded by Larry Kudlow
