= The Clubhouse Network =

Out-of-school learning program

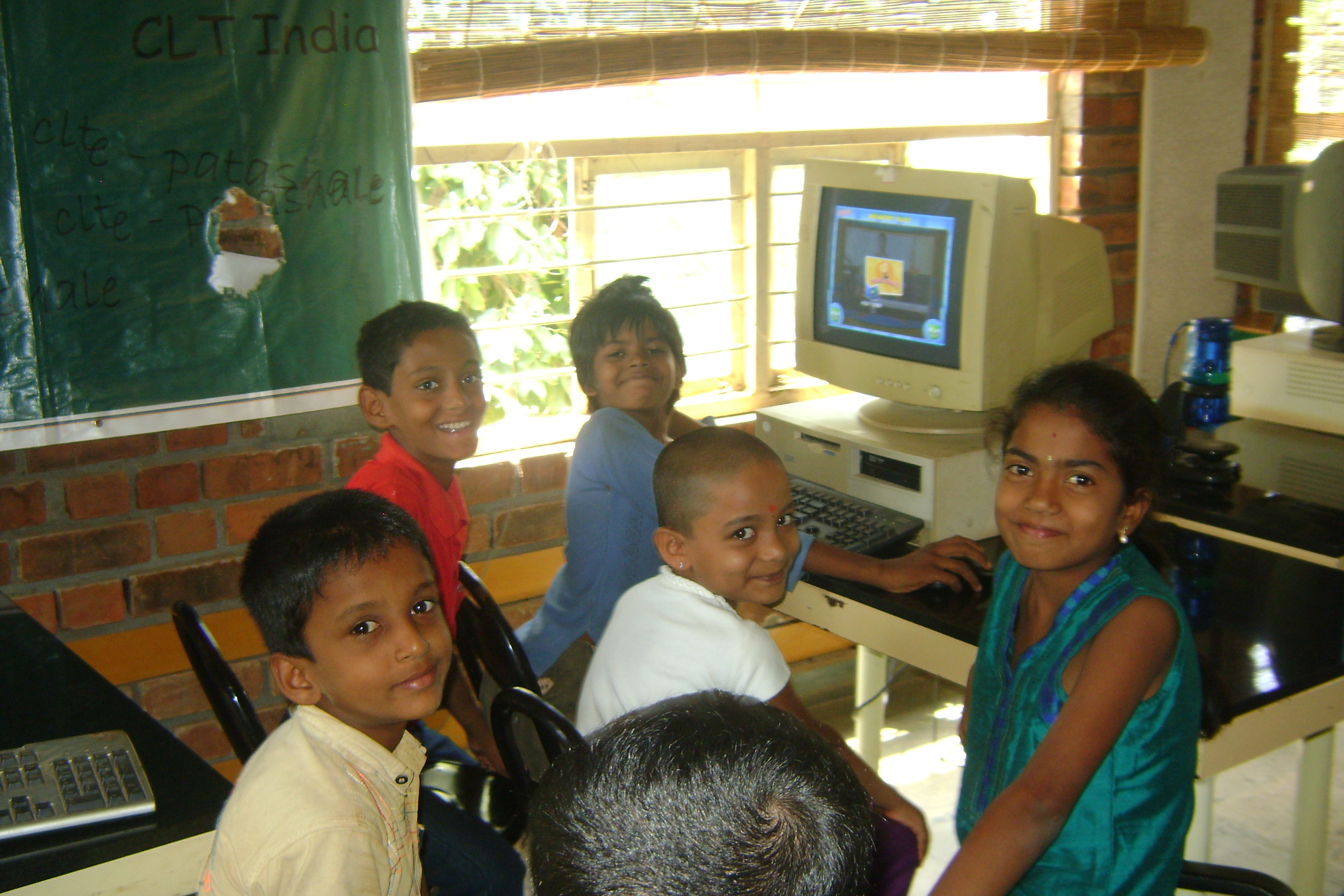
- Clubhouse in Bangalore, India, in 2012
- Nickname: The Clubhouse
- Formation: 1993
- Founded at: Boston, Massachusetts
- Type: Nonprofit
- Region served: Worldwide
- Owner: Brett Collins
- Executive Director: Lisa Cook
- Chair of the Board of Directors: Sean Curran, Waterville Consulting
- Budget: $3.8 million (2022)
- Website: theclubhousenetwork.org
- Formerly called: Computer Clubhouse; Intel Computer Clubhouse

The Clubhouse Network, often shortened to "The Clubhouse," is an American nonprofit organization that provides a free out-of-school learning program where children (ages 10–19) from lower-income communities can work with adult mentors to explore their own ideas, develop new skills, and build confidence in themselves through the use of technology. Its motto is "Where Technology Meets Imagination."

Initially founded in 1993 as the Computer Clubhouse, The Clubhouse is the brainchild of Mitchel Resnick and Natalie Rusk of the MIT Media Lab in Cambridge, Massachusetts, and Stina Cooke of Boston's Computer Museum.

From 2000 to 2015, with an investment of over $50 million from Intel, The Clubhouse Network grew to support nearly 100 community-based Clubhouses in 18 countries: Argentina, Australia, Brazil, Colombia, Costa Rica, Denmark, Ireland, Israel, Jordan, Mexico, New Zealand, Palestine, Panama, Philippines, Russia, Taiwan, South Africa, and the United States. In most cases, local host institutions and agencies donate the space, with funding coming from a variety of sources, and The Clubhouse Network provides technical assistance and other support.

In 2012, Best Buy partnered with The Clubhouse Network to launch multiple learning sites throughout the U.S., operating under the name "Best Buy Teen Tech Centers." The Clubhouse Network provides access to resources, skills, and experience to 25,000 youth per year.

From 2000 to 2017, led by longtime Executive Director Gail Breslow, The Clubhouse Network was part of the Museum of Science, Boston. In 2018, it was separated from the Museum and relocated to the heart of Roxbury in the Nubian Square neighborhood (formerly known as Dudley Square). The Board of Directors selected Lisa Cook to assume the role of Chief Executive Officer in 2022. Under Cook's leadership, The Clubhouse portfolio has expanded from 110 program sites to more than 150 Clubhouses in about two dozen countries.

In 1997, The Clubhouse won the Peter F. Drucker Award for Non-Profit Innovation.

In 2016, The Clubhouse partnered with the MIT Media Lab and Maker Media to publish Start Making! A Guide To Engaging Young People in Maker Activities.

Clubhouses have been utilized as the proving ground for a number of projects of the MIT Media Lab's "Lifelong Kindergarten" research group. Notable examples include:

- Lego Mindstorms programmable bricks, a late 20th-century robotic construction toy.
- PICO programmable Crickets, early 21st-century programmable toys for art construction projects
- Scratch, a 21st-century multimedia programming language for young people.
