= Brian Silverman =

Canadian computer scientist

Brian Silverman is a Canadian computer scientist, the creator of many programming environments for children, and a researcher in cellular automata.

Silverman was a student at the Massachusetts Institute of Technology in the 1970s, where he was one of the creators of a tinkertoy computer that played tic-tac-toe. As a student at MIT, Silverman had worked with Seymour Papert, and when Papert founded Logo Computer Systems, Inc. in 1980 to commercialize the Logo programming language, Silverman became its director of research. He later worked as a consulting scientist at the MIT Media Lab, where he ported Logo to "programmable bricks", a precursor to Lego Mindstorms, and where he was one of the developers of the Scratch programming language. He is the co-founder, along with Paula Bonta and Mitchel Resnick, and president of the Playful Invention Company, headquartered in Montreal, Quebec, Canada, which develops the Programmable Cricket, a spin-off from the Media Lab.

Silverman was part of a team that reverse-engineered the MOS Technology 6502 and Intel 4004 microprocessors and developed transistor-level emulators for them, and that ported Spacewar!, one of the earliest digital computer games, to Java, by writing another emulator for the PDP-1 on which the game was originally written. He also invented several well-known cellular automaton rules, including Brian's Brain, Seeds, and Wireworld; working with his brother Barry Silverman he recovered the IBM APL\360 sources from tape to a state where they could be run on a mainframe emulator.

== Selected publications ==
- Resnick, M.; Martin, F.; Sargent, R.; Silverman, B. (1996), "Programmable Bricks: Toys to think with", IBM Systems Journal, 35 (3.4): 443–452, doi:10.1147/sj.353.0443, S2CID 207590899.
- Resnick, Mitchel; Martin, Fred; Berg, Robert; Borovoy, Rick; Colella, Vanessa; Kramer, Kwin; Silverman, Brian (1998), "Digital manipulatives: new toys to think with", Proceedings of the SIGCHI Conference on Human Factors in Computing Systems, CHI '98, New York, NY, USA: ACM Press/Addison-Wesley Publishing Co., pp. 281–287, doi:10.1145/274644.274684, ISBN 0-201-30987-4, S2CID 1160498.
- Resnick, Mitchel; Silverman, Brian (2005), "Some reflections on designing construction kits for kids", Proceedings of the 2005 Conference on Interaction Design and Children (IDC '05), pp. 117–122, doi:10.1145/1109540.1109556, ISBN 1-59593-096-5, S2CID 207158213.
- Resnick, Mitchel; Maloney, John; Monroy-Hernández, Andrés; Rusk, Natalie; Eastmond, Evelyn; Brennan, Karen; Millner, Amon; Rosenbaum, Eric; Silver, Jay; Silverman, Brian; Kafai, Yasmin (November 2009), "Scratch: programming for all", Communications of the ACM, 52 (11): 60–67, doi:10.1145/1592761.1592779, S2CID 229934947.
