= Student Learning Objectives =

A Student Learning Objectives (SLO) is an assessment tool that allows a teacher to quantify their impact on student achievement as measured within the parameters of a particular academic or elective standard.

== Characteristics ==
In many cases, the standards that will be addressed will be drawn from the Common Core State Standards. Typically the SLO is developed between the teacher and their direct supervisor or principal.

A SLO is an assessment tool that allows a teacher to quantify their impact on student achievement as measured within the parameters of a particular academic or elective standard. In many cases, the standards that will be addressed will be drawn from the Common Core State Standards. Typically the SLO is developed between the teacher and their direct supervisor or principal. As the school year or pre-selected term of the SLO administration proceeds, the teacher will make frequent checks for understanding through various formative assessments. This will allow the teacher to determine the progression of learning for the student research group. At the conclusion of the school year, the teacher will collect the results and meet with their direct supervisor to discuss the data as it applies to the original goal statement. SLOs have to be content and course specific with outcomes that can be measured. One of the main benefits of developing and implementing strong SLOs is the ability to increase student achievement at the classroom level. SLOs are being used as a percentage in the overall teacher evaluation system because it can quantify the pedagogical impact a teacher has on a specific set of students.

An objective is a small goal that needs to be met on the way to fulfilling the larger course outcome or goal. A typical course will have four to five objectives that focus the various learning activities.

== Elements ==
- Data-driven instruction & assessment - The local education agency (LEA) should review past data gathering systems to determine an overarching goal for individual teacher SLO development. It is important to include all educational stakeholders in this process. One was that this could be accomplished is to discuss the SLO with parents on "Meet the Teacher" night. The feedback from the parents would help to validate the importance of the SLO in the lives of students and their parents. Another way to include parents in the discussion would be to sponsor a Google Document that encourages collaboration on the actual SLO document itself.
- Standards-alignment - The development of an effective SLO starts with locating an academic standard that promotes rigorous student learning that results in a measurable student product or outcome. One way to motivate reluctant learners to engage in rigorous academic achievement is to add relevance to their instruction and assessments. For example, when working with a literacy standard dealing with non-fiction reading comprehension it would be beneficial to use real-world documents like an electric bill or an over-the-counter children's pain relief label. The students apply their reading comprehension strategies to documents that they are likely to encounter in the future.
- Instructional timeframe - A SLO can occur within any given timeframe between pre-assessment and post-assessment, but the recommended time period is one academic year.

=== Parts ===
- Learning goals - A teacher-developed description of what the student will know and be able to do at the end of a course based upon an overarching idea for the academic or elective discipline. A teacher will know that they have an effective learning goal when the knowledge or skill can be applied to life outside the classroom. Learning goals provide a common thread that link all units and learning situations within a course. It often answers the question, "What is the BIG idea?"
- Assessments - Valid assessments should support the student progress toward meeting an enduring understanding within the learning goal. The assessments should be based upon standards-aligned to the learning goal. Formative assessment should be collected at multiple points in the semester to determine if the students are on pace to meet the learning goal in the final summative assessment.
- Targets - Using baseline data gleaned from past performance or collected with a pre-assessment, the teacher will contextualize the SLO by establishing class-specific targets for performance levels. It is important to be ambitious and also realistic about expectations of student performance.
