= Larry Kudlow =

American television host and financial analyst (born 1947)

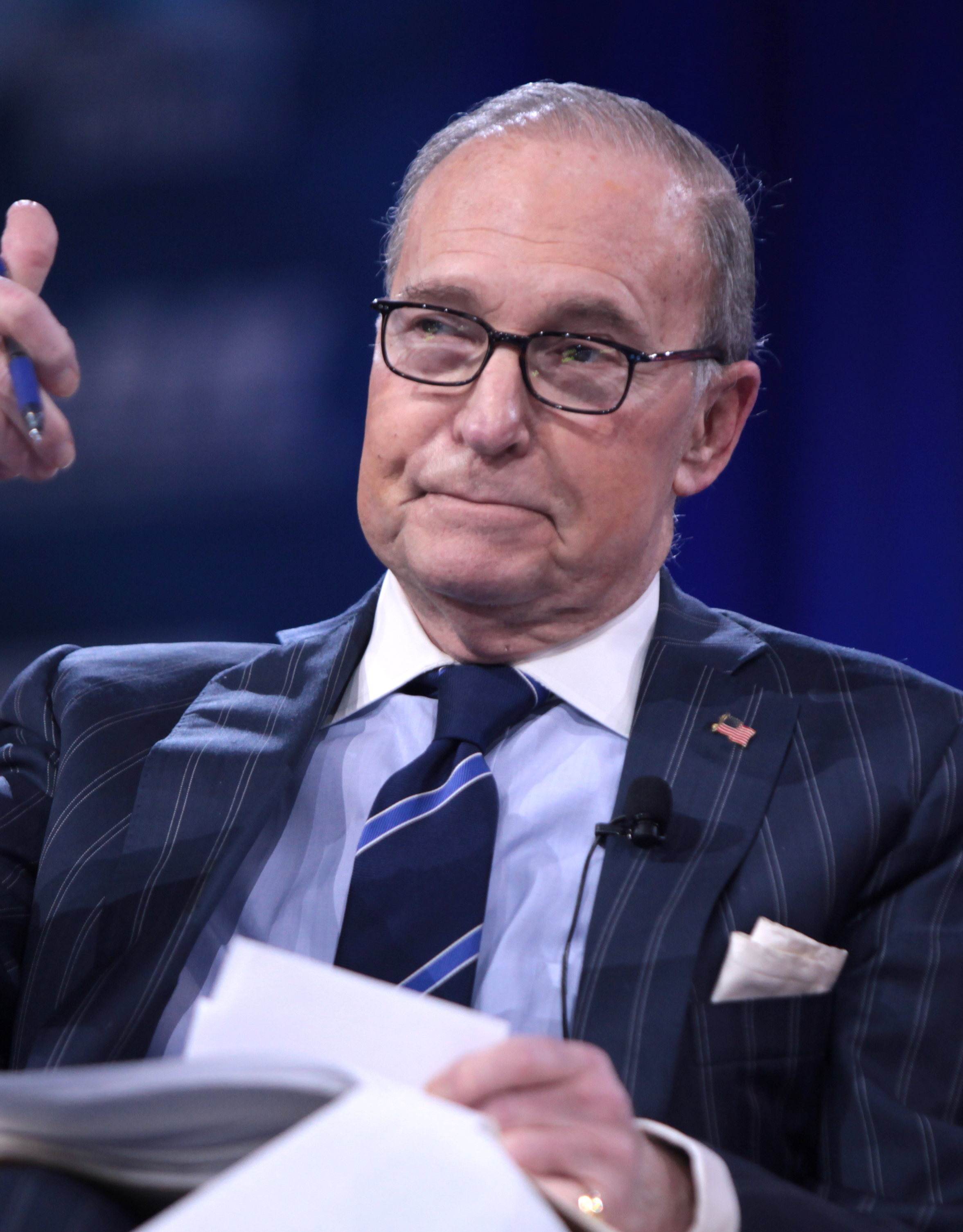
- Kudlow in 2016

12th Director of the National Economic Council
- In office April 2, 2018 – January 20, 2021
- President: Donald Trump
- Preceded by: Gary Cohn
- Succeeded by: Brian Deese

Personal details
- Born: Lawrence Alan Kudlow; August 20, 1947 (age 79) Englewood, New Jersey, U.S.
- Party: Republican (1981–present)
- Other political affiliations: Democratic (before 1981)
- Spouses: Nancy Gerstein (m. 1974; div. 1975); Susan Cullman Sicher (m. 1981, divorced); Judith Pond (m. 1986)
- Education: University of Rochester (BA); Princeton University (attended)

Lawrence Alan Kudlow (born August 20, 1947) is an American conservative broadcast news analyst, economist, columnist, journalist, political commentator, and radio personality. He is a financial news commentator for Fox Business and served as the director of the National Economic Council during the first Trump administration from 2018 to 2021. He assumed that role after his previous employment as a CNBC television financial news host. He is the vice chair of the board of the America First Policy Institute, a nonprofit think tank founded to promote an America First public policy agenda.

Kudlow began his career as a junior financial analyst at the New York Federal Reserve. He soon left government to work on Wall Street at Paine Webber and Bear Stearns as a financial analyst. In 1981, after previously volunteering and working for left-wing politicians and causes, Kudlow joined the administration of Ronald Reagan as associate director for economics and planning in the Office of Management and Budget.

After leaving the Reagan administration during the second term, Kudlow returned to Wall Street and Bear Stearns, serving as the firm's chief economist from 1987 until 1994. During this time, he also advised the gubernatorial campaign of Christine Todd Whitman on economic issues. In the late 1990s, after a publicized battle with cocaine and alcohol addiction, Kudlow left Wall Street to become an economics and financial commentator – first with National Review, and later hosting several shows on CNBC.

== Early life and education ==
Kudlow was born and raised in New Jersey, the son of Ruth (née Grodnick) and Irving Howard Kudlow. He is Jewish. He attended the Elisabeth Morrow School in Englewood, New Jersey, until the sixth grade. He then attended the Dwight-Englewood School through high school.

He graduated from the University of Rochester in Rochester, New York, with a bachelor's degree in history in 1969. According to The New York Times, "While he had no extensive formal training in economics, he had an innate understanding of how markets worked and was comfortable with numbers. And he worked hard to teach himself."

In 1971, Kudlow enrolled in the master's program at Princeton University's Woodrow Wilson School of Public and International Affairs, but he left before completing his degree.

== Career ==
=== Early career ===
Kudlow began his career as a staff economist at the Federal Reserve Bank of New York. He worked in the division of the Fed that handled open market operations.

In 1970, while he was still a Democrat, Kudlow joined Americans for Democratic Action chair Joseph Duffey's "New Politics" senatorial campaign in Connecticut which also attracted an "A-list crowd of young Democrats", including Yale University law student Bill Clinton, John Podesta, and Michael Medved, another future conservative. Duffey was a leading anti-war politician during the Vietnam war era. Duffey's campaign manager called Kudlow a "brilliant organizer". In 1976, he worked on the U.S. Senate campaign of Daniel Patrick Moynihan, along with Tim Russert, against Conservative Party incumbent James L. Buckley, brother of William F. Buckley Jr.

=== Reagan administration ===
During the first term of the Reagan administration (1981–1985), Kudlow was associate director for economics and planning in the Office of Management and Budget (OMB), a part of the Executive Office of the President.

=== Financial services industry ===
In 1987, Kudlow was hired by Bear Stearns as its chief economist and senior managing director. Kudlow also served as an economic counsel to A. B. Laffer & Associates, the San Diego, California, company owned by Arthur Laffer, a major supply-side economist and promoter of the "Laffer Curve", an economic measure of the relationship between tax levels and government revenue. Kudlow was fired from Bear Stearns in the mid-1990s due to his cocaine addiction.

He was a member of the board of directors of Empower America, a supply-side economics organization founded in 1993 and merged in 2004 with the Citizens for a Sound Economy to form FreedomWorks. Kudlow was also a founding member of the board of advisors for the Independent Institute and consulting chief economist for American Skandia Life Assurance, Inc., in Connecticut, a subsidiary of insurance company Prudential Financial.

=== Media ===
Kudlow became economics editor at National Review Online (NRO) in May 2001.

Kudlow served as one in a rotating set of hosts on the CNBC show America Now, which began airing in November 2001. In May 2002, the show was renamed Kudlow & Cramer, and Kudlow and Jim Cramer became the permanent hosts. In January 2005, Cramer left to host his own show, Mad Money, and the program's name was changed the next month to Kudlow & Company. The program went on hiatus in October 2008, returned in January 2009 as The Kudlow Report, and ended its run on CNBC in March 2014.

Kudlow is also a regular guest on Squawk Box. He has contributed to CNBC.com on MSN. Starting in 2004, he also appeared on The John Batchelor Show as a co-host on Tuesdays and as a substitute, until he left to become an economics advisor to President Trump. In March 2006, Kudlow started to host a talk radio show on politics and economics on WABC as The Larry Kudlow Show aired on Saturday mornings from 10 am to 1 pm ET and via nationwide syndication in the US starting June 5, 2010.

Kudlow's name was floated by Republicans as a potential Senate candidate in either Connecticut or New York in 2016. In October 2015, U.S. Senator Richard Blumenthal, in an email to supporters, attacked Kudlow despite Kudlow not being a candidate. In early December 2015, Jack Fowler of National Review created a 527 organization that encouraged Kudlow to run.

=== Director of the National Economic Council ===
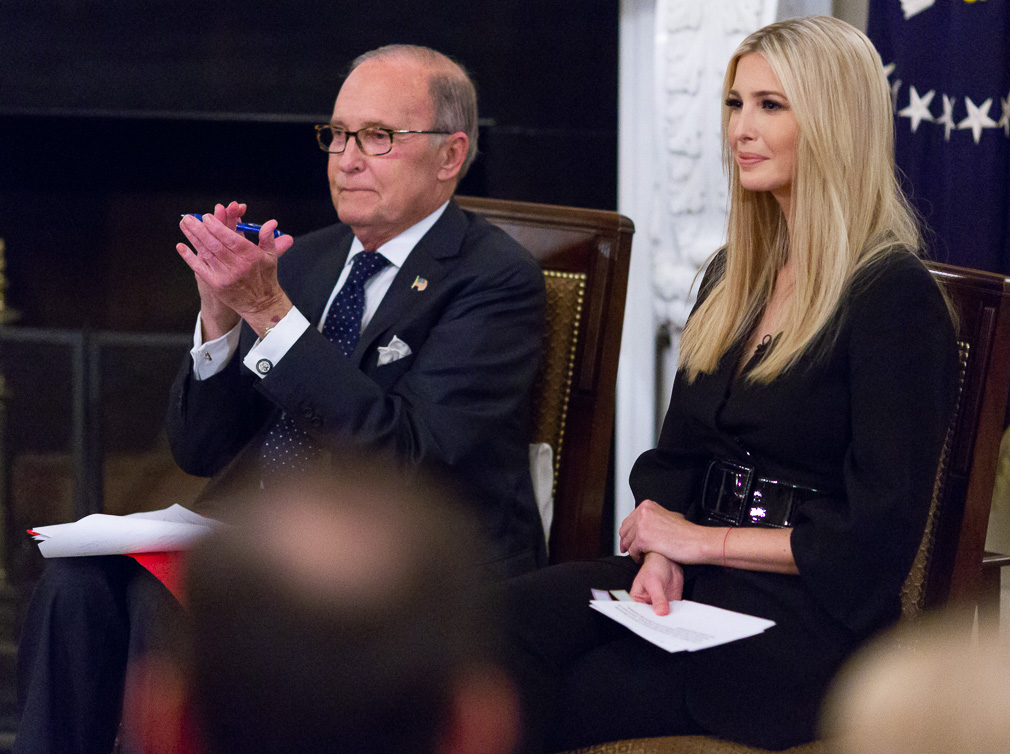
Kudlow with Ivanka Trump in 2018

In March 2018, Donald Trump appointed Kudlow to be director of the National Economic Council (NEC), succeeding Gary Cohn. He assumed office on April 2, 2018. Kudlow's role as director of the NEC was to advise the president on economic matters, devise domestic and international economic policy, ensure policy consistency with the president's goals, and oversee implementation.

During his tenure at the NEC, Kudlow sought to promote the Tax Cuts and Jobs Act of 2017 and advance a de-regulatory agenda. Kudlow believed the tax bill would eventually pay for itself, a stance which put him at odds with the Congressional Budget Office, which projected that the act would increase the deficit. Kudlow evinced optimism about U.S. economic prospects. As a proponent of supply-side economics, which emphasizes tax cuts and deregulation to spur economic growth, he was sometimes at odds with Trump's more protectionist stance on trade. Kudlow defended the use of tariffs as a negotiating tool against China. He was a member of the White House's coronavirus task force.

After the 2018 G7 Summit in Charlevoix, Canada, he criticized Canadian Prime Minister Justin Trudeau in a candid interview with CNN's Jake Tapper, saying that Trudeau had "stabbed us in the back".

Kudlow's tenure at the NEC concluded with the end of the first Trump administration in January 2021.

=== Fox Business ===
In February 2021, Kudlow joined the Fox Business Network as a host, following his tenure as director of the National Economic Council under President Donald Trump. Kudlow, known for his economic commentary, was given the platform to host a weekday show titled "Kudlow," which premiered in early 2021. His program is broadcast at 4 p.m. and 7 p.m. Eastern Time, providing viewers with economic insights, market analysis, and discussions on fiscal policy with various experts and politicians. His show focuses on economic issues from a generally conservative viewpoint, but he also engages in broader economic discussions.

He declined an offer to serve in Donald Trump's second administration, opting instead to continue his work at Fox Business.

== Views ==
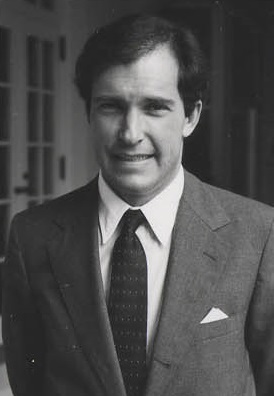
Kudlow in 1981

A self-described "Reagan supply-sider", Kudlow is known for his support for tax cuts and deregulation. He argues that reducing tax rates will encourage economic growth and ultimately increase tax revenue and, while acknowledging the limits of growth, that economic growth will clear deficits. According to The Economist, Kudlow is "the quintessential member of the Republican Party's business wing."

In 1993, Kudlow said that Bill Clinton's tax increases would dampen economic growth.

Kudlow was a strong advocate of George W. Bush's substantial tax cuts, and argued that the tax cuts would lead to an economic boom of equal magnitude. After the implementation of the Bush tax cuts, Kudlow said year after year that the economy was in the middle of a "Bush boom", and chastised other commentators for failing to realize it.

In their 2015 book Superforecasting, University of Pennsylvania political scientist Philip E. Tetlock and Dan Gardner refer to Kudlow as a "consistently wrong" pundit, and use Kudlow's long record of failed predictions to clarify common mistakes that poor forecasters make.

Kudlow is not known as a deficit hawk.

== Personal life ==
Kudlow has been married three times: In 1974, he married Nancy Ellen Gerstein, an editor in The New Yorker magazine's fiction department, with the marriage lasting about a year. In 1981, he married Susan (Cullman) Sicher, whose grandfather was businessman Joseph Cullman and whose great-grandfather was businessman Lyman G. Bloomingdale. The Washington wedding was presided over by U.S. District Judge John Sirica. In 1986, he married Judith "Judy" Pond, a painter and Montana native.

In the mid-1990s, Kudlow left Bear Stearns and entered a 12-step program in order to deal with his addictions to cocaine and alcohol. He subsequently converted to Catholicism under the guidance of Father C. John McCloskey III.

Kudlow is a member of the Catholic Advisory Board of the Ave Maria Mutual Funds. He served as a member of the Fordham University Board of Trustees and is on the advisory committee of the Kemp Institute at the Pepperdine University School of Public Policy.

On June 11, 2018, Kudlow suffered a mild heart attack. He was admitted to Walter Reed Army Medical Center in Washington, D.C., and discharged two days later.

== Books ==
- American Abundance: The New Economic & Moral Prosperity, 1997, HarperCollins, ISBN 0-8281-1117-0
- Bullish On Bush: How George Bush's Ownership Society Will Make America Stronger, 2004, Rowman & Littlefield, ISBN 1-56833-261-0, authored by Stephen Moore and with comments by Kudlow
- Tide: Why Tax Cuts Are the Key to Prosperity and Freedom, 2005, HarperCollins, ISBN 0-06-072345-9 (audio CD)
- JFK and the Reagan Revolution: A Secret History of American Prosperity, 2016, Portfolio, ISBN 1595231145, by Lawrence Kudlow (Author) and Brian Domitrovic (Author)

Political offices
Preceded by Gary Cohn	Director of the National Economic Council; 2018–2021	Succeeded by Brian Deese
