= Mitchel Resnick =

American academic and programmer

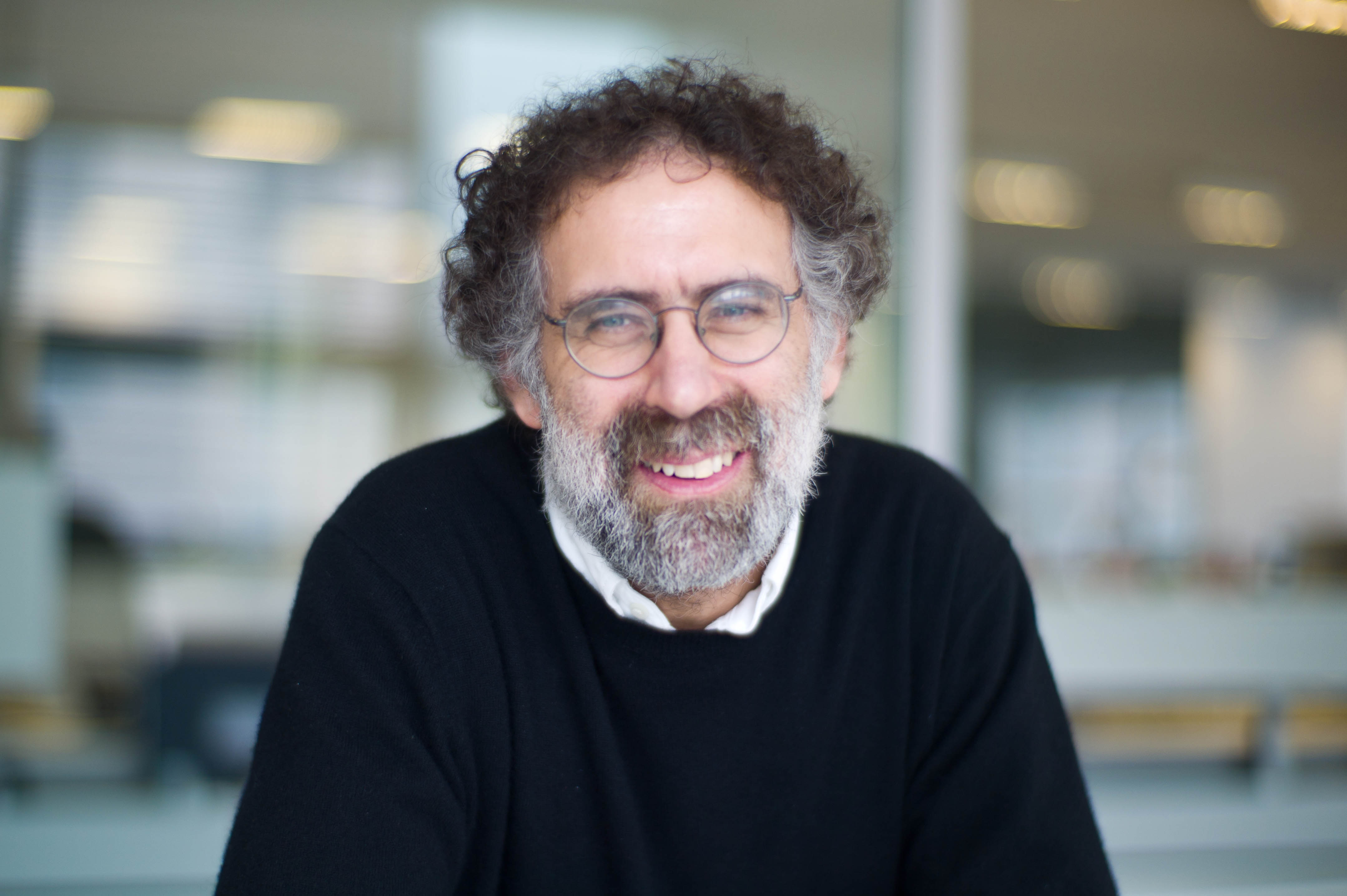
- Resnick in 2011
- Born: June 12, 1956 (age 69)
- Education: Princeton University (BA); Massachusetts Institute of Technology (MS, PhD)
- Known for: StarLogo; Scratch
- Awards: Harold W. McGraw Prize in Education
- Scientific career
- Fields: Computer science Learning sciences Constructionist learning
- Institutions: Massachusetts Institute of Technology
- Doctoral advisors: Seymour Papert; Hal Abelson
- Doctoral students: Amy Bruckman; Randal Pinkett; Jay Silver

Mitchel Resnick (born June 12, 1956) is an American computer scientist. He is the LEGO Papert Professor of Learning Research at the Massachusetts Institute of Technology (MIT) Media Lab, and is the founder of Scratch. As of 2019, Resnick serves as head of the Media Arts and Sciences academic program, which grants master's degrees and Ph.D.s at the MIT Media Lab.

Resnick's research group has developed a variety of educational tools that engage people in new types of design activities and learning experiences, including the Programmable Bricks that were the basis for the Lego Mindstorms and StarLogo software. He cofounded the Computer Clubhouse, a network of learning centers for youth from under-served communities. Resnick is also a cofounder and a co-principal investigator of the Center for Civic Media at MIT. Resnick is also involved in the next generation of Programmable Bricks, and the One Laptop per Child project which designed the OLPC XO ($100 laptop).

== Education ==
Resnick, a graduate of Haverford High School, earned a B.A. in physics at Princeton University (1978), and M.S. and Ph.D. degrees in computer science at MIT (1988, 1992).

== Career ==
He worked for five years as a science–technology journalist for Business Week magazine, and he has consulted widely on the uses of computers in education. Resnick was awarded a National Science Foundation Young Investigator Award in 1993. He has collaborated extensively with researchers such as Natalie Rusk, Brian Silverman, and Yasmin Kafai.

== Awards ==
Resnick is a winner of the 2011 Harold W. McGraw, Jr. Prize in Education. He has been listed as one of the 100 most creative people in Business 2011 by Fast Company. In 2025, he was awarded the SIGCSE Award for Outstanding Contribution to Computer Science Education.

== Published books ==
- Resnick, Mitchel (2017). Lifelong Kindergarten: Cultivating Creativity through Projects, Passions, Peers, and Play. Cambridge, Massachusetts: MIT Press. p. 208. ISBN 9780262037297.
- Resnick, Mitchel; Burns, Marina Umaschi (2015). The Official ScratchJr Book: Help Your Kids Learn To Code. San Francisco, California: No Starch Press. p. 160. ISBN 9781593276713.
- Resnick, Mitchel (1994). Turtles, Termites, and Traffic Jams. Cambridge, Massachusetts: MIT Press. pp. 184. ISBN 9780262181624.
- Colella, Vanessa Stevens; Klopfer, Eric; Resnick, Mitchel (2001-07-11). Adventures in Modeling: Exploring Complex, Dynamic Systems with StarLogo. New York, New York: Teachers College Press. p. 192. ISBN 9780807740828.
- Kafai, Yasmin B.; Resnick, Mitchel (1996-04-01). Constructionism in Practice: Designing, Thinking, and Learning in a Digital World. Abingdon-on-Thames: Routledge. p. 360. ISBN 9780805819847.

== See also ==
- Timeline of programming languages
