= Second cabinet of Donald Trump =

Current Federal Cabinet of the United States

Second Trump Cabinet
- Cabinet of the United States
- 2025–present
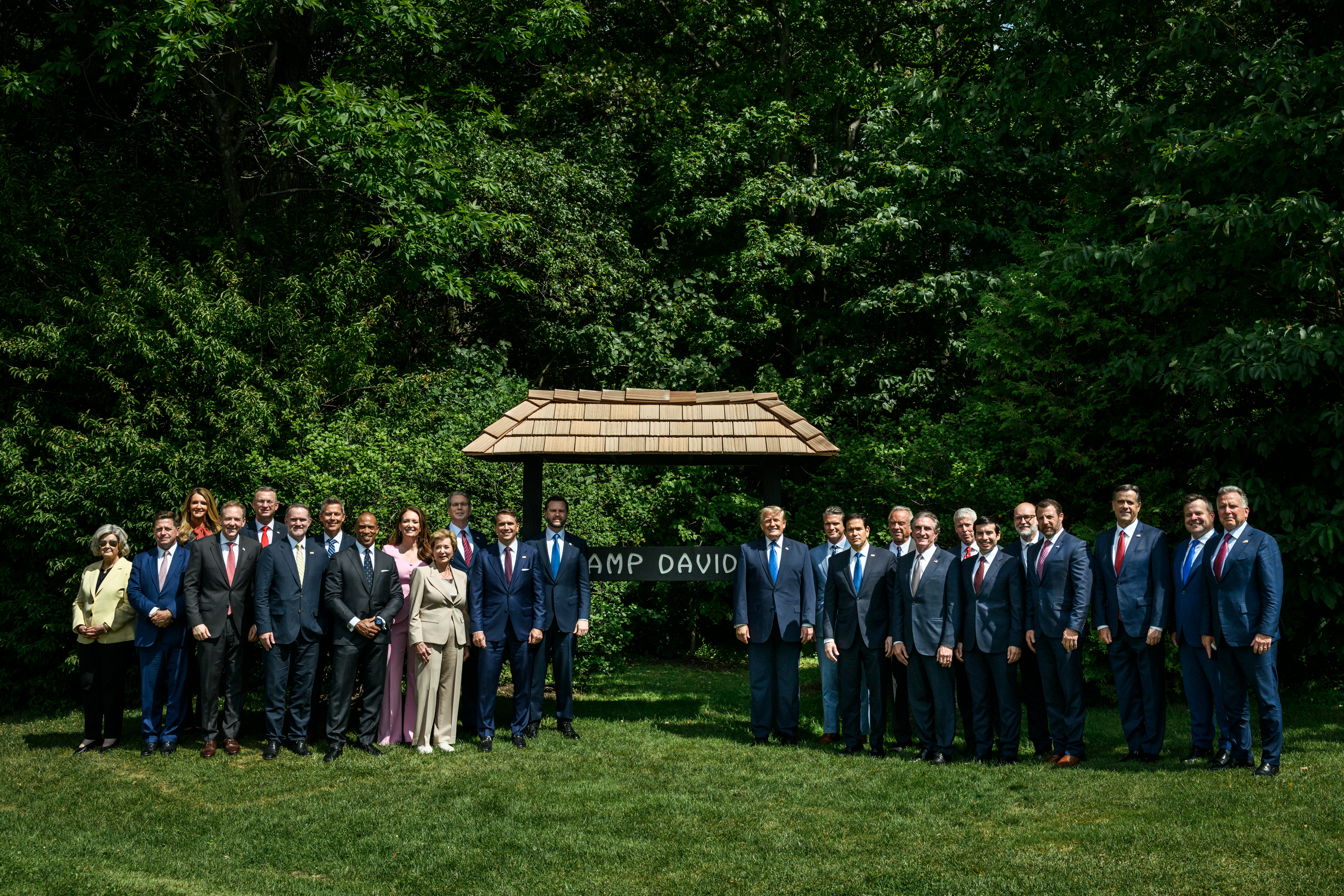
- The second cabinet of President Trump in July 2026
- Date formed: January 20, 2025

People and organizations
- President: Donald Trump
- President's history: President of the United States (2017–2021, 2025–present); Chairman of The Trump Organization (1971–2017)
- Vice President: JD Vance
- Member party: Republican Party
- Status in legislature: Majority government (2025–present)
- Opposition party: Democratic Party

History
- Election: 2024 presidential election
- Legislature term: 119th Congress
- Advice and consent: United States Senate
- Predecessor: Biden cabinet

Donald Trump assumed office as the 47th president of the United States on January 20, 2025. The president has the legal authority to nominate members of his cabinet to the United States Senate for confirmation under the Appointments Clause of the United States Constitution.

== Cabinet ==
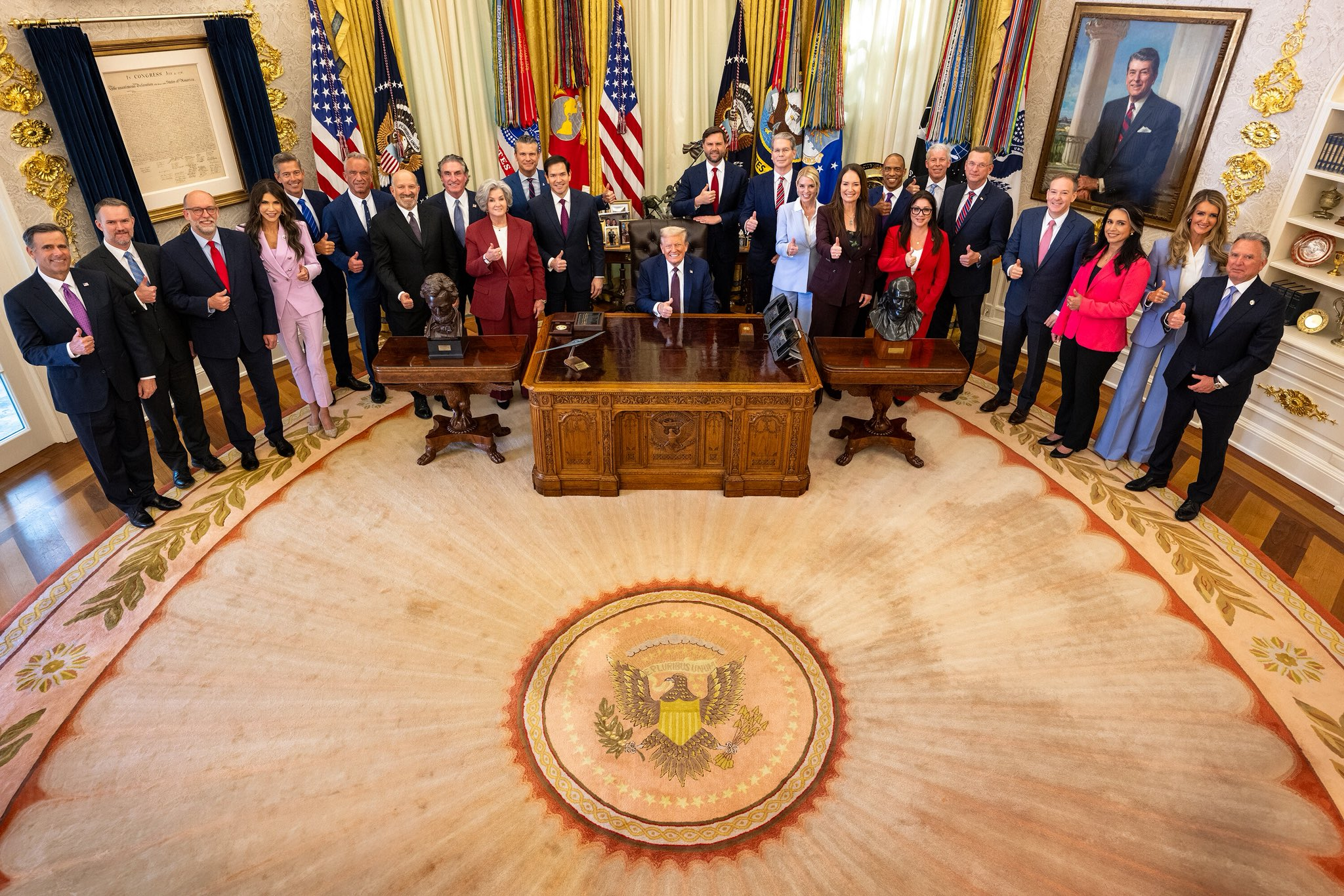

Second Trump cabinet
Office	Name	Term
President	Donald Trump	2025–present
Vice President	JD Vance	2025–present
Secretary of State	Marco Rubio	2025–present
Secretary of the Treasury	Scott Bessent	2025–present
Secretary of Defense	Pete Hegseth	2025–present
Attorney General	Pam Bondi	2025–2026
Todd Blanche	2026–present
Secretary of the Interior	Doug Burgum	2025–present
Secretary of Agriculture	Brooke Rollins	2025–present
Secretary of Commerce	Howard Lutnick	2025–present
Secretary of Labor	Lori Chavez-DeRemer	2025–2026
Keith Sonderling	2026–present
Secretary of Health and Human Services	Robert F. Kennedy Jr.	2025–present
Secretary of Housing and Urban Development	Scott Turner	2025–present
Secretary of Transportation	Sean Duffy	2025–present
Secretary of Energy	Chris Wright	2025–present
Secretary of Education	Linda McMahon	2025–present
Secretary of Veterans Affairs	Doug Collins	2025–present
Secretary of Homeland Security	Kristi Noem	2025–2026
Markwayne Mullin	2026–present
Administrator of the Environmental Protection Agency	Lee Zeldin	2025–present
Director of the Office of Management and Budget	Russell Vought	2025–present
Director of National Intelligence	Tulsi Gabbard	2025–2026
Jay Clayton	2026–present
Director of the Central Intelligence Agency	John Ratcliffe	2025–present
United States Trade Representative	Jamieson Greer	2025–present
Administrator of the Small Business Administration	Kelly Loeffler	2025–present
White House Chief of Staff	Susie Wiles	2025–2026
Stephen Miller	2026–present

All permanent members of the Cabinet of the United States as heads of executive departments require the advice and consent of the United States Senate following appointment by the president before taking office. The vice presidency is exceptional in that the position requires an election to office pursuant to the United States Constitution. The president may also designate heads of other agencies and non-Senate-confirmed members of the Executive Office of the President as cabinet-level members of the cabinet. The cabinet meets with the president in the Cabinet Room, a room adjacent to the Oval Office.

As the Republican Party controls the Senate, it was expected that all of Trump's designees would be confirmed with little contest. However, some nominees were met with criticism by a few Senate Republicans.

Trump's cabinet choices were described by Business Insider and Reuters as valuing personal loyalty over relevant experience, and for having a range of conflicting ideologies and "eclectic personalities". It was also described as the wealthiest administration in modern history, with more than 13 billionaires chosen to take government posts. Trump officials and Elon Musk threatened to fund primary challengers in upcoming elections against Republican senators who did not vote for Trump's nominees. He nominated or appointed 23 former Fox News employees to his administration.

On November 12, 2024, President-elect Trump announced that his administration would establish a Department of Government Efficiency (DOGE). Despite the name, DOGE is not a federal executive department, since official departments require congressional approval, but a component of the Executive Office of the President. Elon Musk, a then senior advisor to the President, played a key role in DOGE's operations before leaving the government in May 2025, as his special employee government contract had ended. Shortly after Musk left the government, Trump and Musk exchanged a public feud over the nearly $3 trillion deficit projected to result from the One Big Beautiful Bill.

The following have been named as cabinet appointees by the president of the United States.

Second cabinet of President Donald Trump
Elected to office – all other cabinet members serve at the pleasure of the president Yet to be confirmed by the Senate Serving in an acting capacity No Senate consent needed
Office Date announced/confirmed	Designee	Office Date announced/confirmed	Designee
Vice President; Announced July 15, 2024; Elected November 5, 2024; Assumed office January 20, 2025	U.S. senator JD Vance from Ohio	Secretary of State; Announced November 12, 2024; Assumed office January 21, 2025	U.S. senator Marco Rubio from Florida
Secretary of the Treasury; Announced November 22, 2024; Assumed office January 28, 2025	Key Square Group CEO; Scott Bessent from South Carolina	Secretary of Defense; Announced November 12, 2024; Assumed office January 25, 2025	TV host and Army veteran Pete Hegseth from Tennessee
Attorney General; Announced June 3, 2026; Assumed office August 10, 2026	Deputy attorney general Todd Blanche from Florida	Secretary of the Interior; Announced November 14, 2024; Assumed office February 1, 2025	Former governor Doug Burgum of North Dakota
Secretary of Agriculture; Announced November 23, 2024; Assumed office February 13, 2025	AFPI president Brooke Rollins from Texas	Secretary of Commerce; Announced November 19, 2024; Assumed office February 21, 2025	Cantor Fitzgerald CEO; Howard Lutnick from New York
Secretary of Labor; Announced June 29, 2026; Assumed office October 2, 2026	Deputy secretary of labor Keith Sonderling from Florida	Secretary of Health and Human Services; Announced November 14, 2024; Assumed office February 13, 2025	Lawyer and activist Robert F. Kennedy Jr. from California
Secretary of Housing and Urban Development; Announced November 22, 2024; Assumed office February 5, 2025	Former state representative Scott Turner from Texas	Secretary of Transportation; Announced November 18, 2024; Assumed office January 28, 2025	Former U.S. representative Sean Duffy from Wisconsin
Secretary of Energy; Announced November 16, 2024; Assumed office February 3, 2025	Liberty Energy CEO; Chris Wright from Colorado	Secretary of Education; Announced November 19, 2024; Assumed office March 3, 2025	Former SBA administrator Linda McMahon from Connecticut
Secretary of Veterans Affairs; Announced November 14, 2024; Assumed office February 5, 2025	Former U.S. representative Doug Collins from Georgia	Secretary of Homeland Security; Announced March 5, 2026; Assumed office March 24, 2026	U.S. senator Markwayne Mullin from Oklahoma
=== Cabinet-level officials ===
Office Date announced/confirmed	Designee	Office Date announced/confirmed	Designee
White House Chief of Staff; Announced November 6, 2026; Assumed office November 9, 2026	Deputy chief of staff Stephen Miller from California	EPA administrator Announced November 11, 2024; Assumed office January 29, 2025	Former U.S. representative Lee Zeldin from New York
OMB director Announced November 22, 2024; Assumed office February 7, 2025	Former OMB director Russell Vought from Virginia	Director of National Intelligence; Announced June 11, 2026; Assumed office August 3, 2026	U.S. attorney Jay Clayton from New York
CIA director Announced November 12, 2024; Assumed office January 23, 2025	Former intelligence director John Ratcliffe from Texas	U.S. Trade Representative; Announced November 26, 2024; Assumed office February 27, 2025	Former USTR chief of staff Jamieson Greer from Maryland
SBA administrator Announced December 4, 2024; Assumed office February 20, 2025	Former U.S. senator Kelly Loeffler from Georgia		

=== Confirmation process ===
Below is a list of confirmations for or withdrawals from Cabinet positions, Cabinet-level positions, and other significant positions that were approved through the Senate from January 2025 onwards, by a recorded roll-call vote, rather than by a voice vote.

Image from Second cabinet of Donald Trump timeline

==== Confirmation votes ====
Senate confirmation votes of President Donald Trump's second cabinet

State	Senator	Party	Jan 20, 2025 Marco Rubio State 99–0	Jan 23, 2025 John Ratcliffe CIA 74–25	Jan 24, 2025 Pete Hegseth Defense 51–50 (Note: Vice President JD Vance provided the tie-breaking vote.)	Jan 25, 2025 Kristi Noem DHS 59–34	Jan 27, 2025 Scott Bessent Treasury 68–29	Jan 28, 2025 Sean Duffy DoT 77–22	Jan 29, 2025 Lee Zeldin EPA 56–42	Jan 30, 2025 Doug Burgum Interior 80–17
Alabama	Tommy Tuberville	R	Yea	Yea	Yea	Yea	Yea	Yea	Yea	Yea
Alabama	Katie Britt	R	Yea	Yea	Yea	Yea	Yea	Yea	Yea	Yea
Alaska	Lisa Murkowski	R	Yea	Yea	Nay	Yea	Yea	Yea	Yea	Yea
Alaska	Dan Sullivan	R	Yea	Yea	Yea	Yea	Yea	Yea	Yea	Yea
Arizona	Mark Kelly	D	Yea	Yea	Nay	Nay	Yea	Yea	Yea	Yea
Arizona	Ruben Gallego	D	Yea	Yea	Nay	Nay	Yea	Yea	Yea	Yea
Arkansas	John Boozman	R	Yea	Yea	Yea	Yea	Yea	Yea	Yea	Yea
Arkansas	Tom Cotton	R	Yea	Yea	Yea	Yea	Yea	Yea	Yea	Yea
California	Alex Padilla	D	Yea	Nay	Nay	Nay	No vote	Yea	Nay	Yea
California	Adam Schiff	D	Yea	Nay	Nay	Nay	Nay	Yea	Nay	Nay
Colorado	Michael Bennet	D	Yea	Yea	Nay	Nay	Nay	Yea	Nay	Yea
Colorado	John Hickenlooper	D	Yea	Yea	Nay	Nay	Yea	Yea	Nay	Yea
Connecticut	Richard Blumenthal	D	Yea	Nay	Nay	Nay	Nay	Nay	Nay	Yea
Connecticut	Chris Murphy	D	Yea	Nay	Nay	Nay	Nay	Nay	Nay	Nay
Delaware	Chris Coons	D	Yea	Yea	Nay	Nay	Yea	Nay	Nay	Nay
Delaware	Lisa Blunt Rochester	D	Yea	Nay	Nay	Nay	Yea	Nay	Nay	Nay
Florida	Rick Scott	R	Yea	Yea	Yea	Yea	Yea	Yea	Yea	Yea
Florida	Marco Rubio	R	Yea (Note: Rubio was still serving in the Senate when he voted to confirm himself. Moody was appointed to fill the vacancy on January 21.)	—						
Florida	Ashley Moody	R	—	Yea	Yea	Yea	Yea	Yea	Yea	Yea
Georgia	Jon Ossoff	D	Yea	Nay	Nay	Nay	Nay	No vote	No vote	No vote
Georgia	Raphael Warnock	D	Yea	Nay	Nay	No vote	No vote	Yea	Nay	Yea
Hawaii	Brian Schatz	D	Yea	Nay	Nay	No vote	Nay	Yea	Nay	Yea
Hawaii	Mazie Hirono	D	Yea	Nay	Nay	Nay	Nay	Nay	Nay	Nay
Idaho	Mike Crapo	R	Yea	Yea	Yea	Yea	Yea	Yea	Yea	Yea
Idaho	Jim Risch	R	Yea	Yea	Yea	Yea	Yea	Yea	Yea	Yea
Illinois	Dick Durbin	D	Yea	Yea	Nay	Nay	Nay	Nay	Nay	Yea
Illinois	Tammy Duckworth	D	Yea	Nay	Nay	Nay	Nay	Nay	Nay	Nay
Indiana	Todd Young	R	Yea	Yea	Yea	Yea	Yea	Yea	Yea	Yea
Indiana	Jim Banks	R	Yea	Yea	Yea	Yea	Yea	Yea	Yea	Yea
Iowa	Chuck Grassley	R	Yea	Yea	Yea	Yea	Yea	Yea	Yea	Yea
Iowa	Joni Ernst	R	Yea	Yea	Yea	Yea	Yea	Yea	Yea	Yea
Kansas	Jerry Moran	R	Yea	Yea	Yea	No vote	Yea	Yea	Yea	Yea
Kansas	Roger Marshall	R	Yea	Yea	Yea	Yea	Yea	Yea	Yea	Yea
Kentucky	Mitch McConnell	R	Yea	Yea	Nay	Yea	Yea	Yea	Yea	Yea
Kentucky	Rand Paul	R	Yea	Yea	Yea	Yea	Yea	Yea	Yea	Yea
Louisiana	Bill Cassidy	R	Yea	Yea	Yea	Yea	Yea	Yea	Yea	Yea
Louisiana	John Kennedy	R	Yea	Yea	Yea	Yea	Yea	Yea	Yea	Yea
Maine	Susan Collins	R	Yea	Yea	Nay	Yea	Yea	Yea	Yea	Yea
Maine	Angus King	I-D	Yea	Yea	Nay	No vote	Yea	Yea	Nay	Yea
Maryland	Chris Van Hollen	D	Yea	Nay	Nay	Nay	Nay	Nay	Nay	Nay
Maryland	Angela Alsobrooks	D	Yea	Yea	Nay	Nay	Nay	Yea	Nay	Yea
Massachusetts	Elizabeth Warren	D	Yea	Nay	Nay	Nay	Nay	Nay	Nay	Nay
Massachusetts	Ed Markey	D	Yea	Nay	Nay	Nay	Nay	Nay	Nay	Nay
Michigan	Gary Peters	D	Yea	Yea	Nay	Yea	Yea	Yea	Nay	Nay
Michigan	Elissa Slotkin	D	Yea	Yea	Nay	Yea	Yea	Nay	Nay	Yea
Minnesota	Amy Klobuchar	D	Yea	Yea	Nay	Nay	Nay	Yea	Nay	Yea
Minnesota	Tina Smith	D	Yea	Nay	Nay	No vote	Nay	Nay	Nay	Yea
Mississippi	Roger Wicker	R	Yea	Yea	Yea	Yea	Yea	Yea	Yea	Yea
Mississippi	Cindy Hyde-Smith	R	Yea	Yea	Yea	Yea	Yea	Yea	Yea	Yea
Missouri	Josh Hawley	R	Yea	Yea	Yea	Yea	Yea	Yea	Yea	Yea
Missouri	Eric Schmitt	R	Yea	Yea	Yea	Yea	Yea	Yea	Yea	Yea
Montana	Steve Daines	R	Yea	Yea	Yea	Yea	Yea	Yea	Yea	Yea
Montana	Tim Sheehy	R	Yea	Yea	Yea	Yea	No vote	Yea	Yea	Yea
Nebraska	Deb Fischer	R	Yea	Yea	Yea	Yea	Yea	Yea	Yea	Yea
Nebraska	Pete Ricketts	R	Yea	Yea	Yea	Yea	Yea	Yea	Yea	Yea
Nevada	Catherine Cortez Masto	D	Yea	Nay	Nay	Nay	Nay	Nay	Nay	Yea
Nevada	Jacky Rosen	D	Yea	Yea	Nay	Nay	Nay	Yea	Nay	Yea
New Hampshire	Jeanne Shaheen	D	Yea	Yea	Nay	Yea	Yea	Yea	Nay	Yea
New Hampshire	Maggie Hassan	D	Yea	Yea	Nay	Yea	Yea	Yea	Nay	Yea
New Jersey	Cory Booker	D	Yea	Yea	Nay	Nay	Yea	Nay	No vote	No vote
New Jersey	Andy Kim	D	Yea	Yea	Nay	Yea	Nay	Nay	Nay	Nay
New Mexico	Martin Heinrich	D	Yea	Nay	Nay	Nay	Nay	Nay	Nay	Yea
New Mexico	Ben Ray Luján	D	Yea	Nay	Nay	Nay	Nay	Nay	Nay	Yea
New York	Chuck Schumer	D	Yea	Nay	Nay	Nay	Nay	Yea	Nay	Nay
New York	Kirsten Gillibrand	D	Yea	Yea	Nay	Nay	Yea	Yea	Nay	Yea
North Carolina	Thom Tillis	R	Yea	Yea	Yea	Yea	Yea	Yea	Yea	Yea
North Carolina	Ted Budd	R	Yea	Yea	Yea	Yea	Yea	Yea	Yea	Yea
North Dakota	John Hoeven	R	Yea	Yea	Yea	Yea	Yea	Yea	Yea	Yea
North Dakota	Kevin Cramer	R	Yea	Yea	Yea	Yea	Yea	Yea	Yea	Yea
Ohio	Bernie Moreno	R	Yea	Yea	Yea	Yea	Yea	Yea	Yea	Yea
Ohio	Jon Husted	R	— (Note: Having resigned on January 10, Vance's Senate seat was left vacant until Husted was appointed as his successor on January 21.)	Yea	Yea	Yea	Yea	Yea	Yea	Yea
Oklahoma	James Lankford	R	Yea	Yea	Yea	Yea	Yea	Yea	Yea	Yea
Oklahoma	Markwayne Mullin	R	Yea	Yea	Yea	Yea	Yea	Yea	Yea	Yea
Oregon	Ron Wyden	D	Yea	Nay	Nay	No vote	Nay	Nay	Nay	Nay
Oregon	Jeff Merkley	D	Yea	Nay	Nay	No vote	Nay	Nay	Nay	Nay
Pennsylvania	John Fetterman	D	Yea	No vote	Nay	Yea	Yea	Yea	Yea	No vote
Pennsylvania	Dave McCormick	R	Yea	Yea	Yea	Yea	Yea	Yea	Yea	Yea
Rhode Island	Jack Reed	D	Yea	Nay	Nay	Nay	Nay	Nay	Nay	Nay
Rhode Island	Sheldon Whitehouse	D	Yea	Yea	Nay	Nay	Nay	Yea	Nay	Yea
South Carolina	Lindsey Graham	R	Yea	Yea	Yea	Yea	Yea	Yea	Yea	Yea
South Carolina	Tim Scott	R	Yea	Yea	Yea	Yea	Yea	Yea	Yea	Yea
South Dakota	John Thune	R	Yea	Yea	Yea	Yea	Yea	Yea	Yea	Yea
South Dakota	Mike Rounds	R	Yea	Yea	Yea	Yea	Yea	Yea	Yea	Yea
Tennessee	Marsha Blackburn	R	Yea	Yea	Yea	Yea	Yea	Yea	Yea	Yea
Tennessee	Bill Hagerty	R	Yea	Yea	Yea	Yea	Yea	Yea	Yea	Yea
Texas	John Cornyn	R	Yea	Yea	Yea	Yea	Yea	Yea	Yea	Yea
Texas	Ted Cruz	R	Yea	Yea	Yea	Yea	Yea	Yea	Yea	Yea
Utah	Mike Lee	R	Yea	Yea	Yea	Yea	Yea	Yea	Yea	Yea
Utah	John Curtis	R	Yea	Yea	Yea	Yea	Yea	Yea	Yea	Yea
Vermont	Bernie Sanders	I-D	Yea	Nay	Nay	Nay	Nay	Nay	Nay	Nay
Vermont	Peter Welch	D	Yea	Yea	Nay	Nay	Nay	Yea	Nay	Yea
Virginia	Mark Warner	D	Yea	Yea	Nay	Nay	Yea	Yea	Nay	Yea
Virginia	Tim Kaine	D	Yea	Yea	Nay	Yea	Yea	Yea	Nay	Yea
Washington	Patty Murray	D	Yea	Nay	Nay	Nay	Nay	Nay	Nay	Nay
Washington	Maria Cantwell	D	Yea	Nay	Nay	Nay	Yea	Yea	Nay	Yea
West Virginia	Shelley Moore Capito	R	Yea	Yea	Yea	Yea	Yea	Yea	Yea	Yea
West Virginia	Jim Justice	R	Yea	Yea	Yea	Yea	Yea	Yea	Yea	Yea
Wisconsin	Ron Johnson	R	Yea	Yea	Yea	Yea	Yea	Yea	Yea	Yea
Wisconsin	Tammy Baldwin	D	Yea	Nay	Nay	Nay	Nay	Yea	Nay	Yea
Wyoming	John Barrasso	R	Yea	Yea	Yea	Yea	Yea	Yea	Yea	Yea
Wyoming	Cynthia Lummis	R	Yea	Yea	Yea	Yea	Yea	Yea	Yea	Yea
	vote by party	R D Ind.	52–0; 45–0; 2–0; Rubio	53–0; 20–24 (1 NV); 1–1; Ratcliffe	50–3 (VP: Y); 0–45; 0–2; Hegseth	52–0 (1 NV); 7–33 (5 NV); 0–1 (1 NV); Noem	52–0 (1 NV); 15–28 (2 NV); 1–1; Bessent	53–0; 23–21 (1 NV); 1–1; Duffy	53–0; 3–40 (2 NV); 0–2; Zeldin	53–0; 26–16 (3 NV); 1–1; Burgum

State	Senator	Party	Feb 3, 2025 Chris Wright Energy 59–38	Feb 4, 2025 Doug Collins VA 77–23	Feb 4, 2025 Pam Bondi Justice 54–46	Feb 5, 2025 Scott Turner HUD 55–44	Feb 6, 2025 Russell Vought OMB 53–47	Feb 12, 2025 Tulsi Gabbard DNI 52–48	Feb 13, 2025 Robert F. Kennedy Jr. HHS 52–48	Feb 13, 2025 Brooke Rollins USDA 72–28
Alabama	Tommy Tuberville	R	Yea	Yea	Yea	Yea	Yea	Yea	Yea	Yea
Alabama	Katie Britt	R	Yea	Yea	Yea	Yea	Yea	Yea	Yea	Yea
Alaska	Lisa Murkowski	R	Yea	Yea	Yea	Yea	Yea	Yea	Yea	Yea
Alaska	Dan Sullivan	R	Yea	Yea	Yea	Yea	Yea	Yea	Yea	Yea
Arizona	Mark Kelly	D	Nay	Yea	Nay	Nay	Nay	Nay	Nay	Nay
Arizona	Ruben Gallego	D	Yea	Yea	Nay	Nay	Nay	Nay	Nay	Yea
Arkansas	John Boozman	R	Yea	Yea	Yea	Yea	Yea	Yea	Yea	Yea
Arkansas	Tom Cotton	R	Yea	Yea	Yea	Yea	Yea	Yea	Yea	Yea
California	Alex Padilla	D	Nay	Nay	Nay	Nay	Nay	Nay	Nay	Nay
California	Adam Schiff	D	Nay	Yea	Nay	Nay	Nay	Nay	Nay	Yea
Colorado	Michael Bennet	D	Yea	Yea	Nay	Nay	Nay	Nay	Nay	Yea
Colorado	John Hickenlooper	D	Yea	Yea	Nay	Nay	Nay	Nay	Nay	Yea
Connecticut	Richard Blumenthal	D	Nay	Yea	Nay	Nay	Nay	Nay	Nay	Nay
Connecticut	Chris Murphy	D	Nay	Nay	Nay	Nay	Nay	Nay	Nay	Nay
Delaware	Chris Coons	D	Nay	Nay	Nay	Nay	Nay	Nay	Nay	Nay
Delaware	Lisa Blunt Rochester	D	Nay	Nay	Nay	Nay	Nay	Nay	Nay	Nay
Florida	Rick Scott	R	Yea	Yea	Yea	Yea	Yea	Yea	Yea	Yea
Florida	Ashley Moody	R	Yea	Yea	Yea	Yea	Yea	Yea	Yea	Yea
Georgia	Jon Ossoff	D	Nay	Yea	Nay	Nay	Nay	Nay	Nay	Yea
Georgia	Raphael Warnock	D	Nay	Yea	Nay	Nay	Nay	Nay	Nay	Yea
Hawaii	Brian Schatz	D	Nay	Nay	Nay	Nay	Nay	Nay	Nay	Nay
Hawaii	Mazie Hirono	D	Nay	Nay	Nay	Nay	Nay	Nay	Nay	Nay
Idaho	Mike Crapo	R	Yea	Yea	Yea	Yea	Yea	Yea	Yea	Yea
Idaho	Jim Risch	R	Yea	Yea	Yea	Yea	Yea	Yea	Yea	Yea
Illinois	Dick Durbin	D	Nay	Yea	Nay	Nay	Nay	Nay	Nay	Yea
Illinois	Tammy Duckworth	D	Nay	Nay	Nay	Nay	Nay	Nay	Nay	Nay
Indiana	Todd Young	R	Yea	Yea	Yea	Yea	Yea	Yea	Yea	Yea
Indiana	Jim Banks	R	Yea	Yea	Yea	Yea	Yea	Yea	Yea	Yea
Iowa	Chuck Grassley	R	Yea	Yea	Yea	Yea	Yea	Yea	Yea	Yea
Iowa	Joni Ernst	R	Yea	Yea	Yea	Yea	Yea	Yea	Yea	Yea
Kansas	Jerry Moran	R	Yea	Yea	Yea	Yea	Yea	Yea	Yea	Yea
Kansas	Roger Marshall	R	Yea	Yea	Yea	Yea	Yea	Yea	Yea	Yea
Kentucky	Mitch McConnell	R	Yea	Yea	Yea	Yea	Yea	Nay	Nay	Yea
Kentucky	Rand Paul	R	Yea	Yea	Yea	Yea	Yea	Yea	Yea	Yea
Louisiana	Bill Cassidy	R	Yea	Yea	Yea	Yea	Yea	Yea	Yea	Yea
Louisiana	John Kennedy	R	Yea	Yea	Yea	Yea	Yea	Yea	Yea	Yea
Maine	Susan Collins	R	Yea	Yea	Yea	Yea	Yea	Yea	Yea	Yea
Maine	Angus King	I-D	Yea	Yea	Nay	Nay	Nay	Nay	Nay	Nay
Maryland	Chris Van Hollen	D	Nay	Nay	Nay	No vote	Nay	Nay	Nay	Nay
Maryland	Angela Alsobrooks	D	Nay	Nay	Nay	Nay	Nay	Nay	Nay	Nay
Massachusetts	Elizabeth Warren	D	Nay	Nay	Nay	Nay	Nay	Nay	Nay	Nay
Massachusetts	Ed Markey	D	Nay	Nay	Nay	Nay	Nay	Nay	Nay	Nay
Michigan	Gary Peters	D	Nay	Yea	Nay	Nay	Nay	Nay	Nay	Yea
Michigan	Elissa Slotkin	D	Nay	Yea	Nay	Nay	Nay	Nay	Nay	Yea
Minnesota	Amy Klobuchar	D	Nay	Yea	Nay	Nay	Nay	Nay	Nay	Yea
Minnesota	Tina Smith	D	Nay	Nay	Nay	Nay	Nay	Nay	Nay	Nay
Mississippi	Roger Wicker	R	Yea	Yea	Yea	Yea	Yea	Yea	Yea	Yea
Mississippi	Cindy Hyde-Smith	R	No vote	Yea	Yea	Yea	Yea	Yea	Yea	Yea
Missouri	Josh Hawley	R	Yea	Yea	Yea	Yea	Yea	Yea	Yea	Yea
Missouri	Eric Schmitt	R	Yea	Yea	Yea	Yea	Yea	Yea	Yea	Yea
Montana	Steve Daines	R	Yea	Yea	Yea	Yea	Yea	Yea	Yea	Yea
Montana	Tim Sheehy	R	Yea	Yea	Yea	Yea	Yea	Yea	Yea	Yea
Nebraska	Deb Fischer	R	Yea	Yea	Yea	Yea	Yea	Yea	Yea	Yea
Nebraska	Pete Ricketts	R	Yea	Yea	Yea	Yea	Yea	Yea	Yea	Yea
Nevada	Catherine Cortez Masto	D	Nay	Yea	Nay	Nay	Nay	Nay	Nay	Yea
Nevada	Jacky Rosen	D	Nay	Yea	Nay	Nay	Nay	Nay	Nay	Yea
New Hampshire	Jeanne Shaheen	D	Yea	Yea	Nay	Nay	Nay	Nay	Nay	Yea
New Hampshire	Maggie Hassan	D	Yea	Yea	Nay	Nay	Nay	Nay	Nay	Yea
New Jersey	Cory Booker	D	Nay	Nay	Nay	Nay	Nay	Nay	Nay	Yea
New Jersey	Andy Kim	D	Nay	Nay	Nay	Nay	Nay	Nay	Nay	Nay
New Mexico	Martin Heinrich	D	Yea	Yea	Nay	Nay	Nay	Nay	Nay	Yea
New Mexico	Ben Ray Luján	D	Yea	Yea	Nay	Nay	Nay	Nay	Nay	Nay
New York	Chuck Schumer	D	Nay	Nay	Nay	Nay	Nay	Nay	Nay	Nay
New York	Kirsten Gillibrand	D	Nay	Yea	Nay	Nay	Nay	Nay	Nay	Nay
North Carolina	Thom Tillis	R	Yea	Yea	Yea	Yea	Yea	Yea	Yea	Yea
North Carolina	Ted Budd	R	Yea	Yea	Yea	Yea	Yea	Yea	Yea	Yea
North Dakota	John Hoeven	R	Yea	Yea	Yea	Yea	Yea	Yea	Yea	Yea
North Dakota	Kevin Cramer	R	Yea	Yea	Yea	Yea	Yea	Yea	Yea	Yea
Ohio	Bernie Moreno	R	Yea	Yea	Yea	Yea	Yea	Yea	Yea	Yea
Ohio	Jon Husted	R	Yea	Yea	Yea	Yea	Yea	Yea	Yea	Yea
Oklahoma	James Lankford	R	Yea	Yea	Yea	Yea	Yea	Yea	Yea	Yea
Oklahoma	Markwayne Mullin	R	Yea	Yea	Yea	Yea	Yea	Yea	Yea	Yea
Oregon	Ron Wyden	D	Nay	Nay	Nay	Nay	Nay	Nay	Nay	Nay
Oregon	Jeff Merkley	D	Nay	Nay	Nay	Nay	Nay	Nay	Nay	Nay
Pennsylvania	John Fetterman	D	No vote	Yea	Yea	Yea	Nay	Nay	Nay	Yea
Pennsylvania	Dave McCormick	R	Yea	Yea	Yea	Yea	Yea	Yea	Yea	Yea
Rhode Island	Jack Reed	D	Nay	Nay	Nay	Nay	Nay	Nay	Nay	Nay
Rhode Island	Sheldon Whitehouse	D	Nay	Nay	Nay	Nay	Nay	Nay	Nay	Nay
South Carolina	Lindsey Graham	R	No vote	Yea	Yea	Yea	Yea	Yea	Yea	Yea
South Carolina	Tim Scott	R	Yea	Yea	Yea	Yea	Yea	Yea	Yea	Yea
South Dakota	John Thune	R	Yea	Yea	Yea	Yea	Yea	Yea	Yea	Yea
South Dakota	Mike Rounds	R	Yea	Yea	Yea	Yea	Yea	Yea	Yea	Yea
Tennessee	Marsha Blackburn	R	Yea	Yea	Yea	Yea	Yea	Yea	Yea	Yea
Tennessee	Bill Hagerty	R	Yea	Yea	Yea	Yea	Yea	Yea	Yea	Yea
Texas	John Cornyn	R	Yea	Yea	Yea	Yea	Yea	Yea	Yea	Yea
Texas	Ted Cruz	R	Yea	Yea	Yea	Yea	Yea	Yea	Yea	Yea
Utah	Mike Lee	R	Yea	Yea	Yea	Yea	Yea	Yea	Yea	Yea
Utah	John Curtis	R	Yea	Yea	Yea	Yea	Yea	Yea	Yea	Yea
Vermont	Bernie Sanders	I-D	Nay	Yea	Nay	Nay	Nay	Nay	Nay	Nay
Vermont	Peter Welch	D	Nay	Yea	Nay	Yea	Nay	Nay	Nay	Yea
Virginia	Mark Warner	D	Nay	Nay	Nay	Nay	Nay	Nay	Nay	Nay
Virginia	Tim Kaine	D	Nay	Yea	Nay	Nay	Nay	Nay	Nay	Nay
Washington	Patty Murray	D	Nay	Nay	Nay	Nay	Nay	Nay	Nay	Nay
Washington	Maria Cantwell	D	Nay	Nay	Nay	Nay	Nay	Nay	Nay	Nay
West Virginia	Shelley Moore Capito	R	Yea	Yea	Yea	Yea	Yea	Yea	Yea	Yea
West Virginia	Jim Justice	R	Yea	Yea	Yea	Yea	Yea	Yea	Yea	Yea
Wisconsin	Ron Johnson	R	Yea	Yea	Yea	Yea	Yea	Yea	Yea	Yea
Wisconsin	Tammy Baldwin	D	Nay	Nay	Nay	Nay	Nay	Nay	Nay	Yea
Wyoming	John Barrasso	R	Yea	Yea	Yea	Yea	Yea	Yea	Yea	Yea
Wyoming	Cynthia Lummis	R	Yea	Yea	Yea	Yea	Yea	Yea	Yea	Yea
	vote by party	R D Ind.	51–0 (2 NV); 7–37 (1 NV); 1–1; Wright	53–0; 22–23; 2–0; Collins	53–0; 1–44; 0–2; Bondi	53–0; 2–42 (1 NV); 0–2; Turner	53–0; 0–45; 0–2; Vought	52–1; 0–45; 0–2; Gabbard	52–1; 0–45; 0–2; Kennedy	53–0; 19–26; 0–2; Rollins

State	Senator	Party	Feb 18, 2025 Howard Lutnick Commerce 51–45	Feb 19, 2025 Kelly Loeffler SBA 52–46	Feb 26, 2025 Jamieson Greer Trade 56–43	Mar 3, 2025 Linda McMahon Education 51–45	Mar 10, 2025 Lori Chavez-DeRemer Labor 67–32	Mar 23, 2026 Markwayne Mullin DHS 54–45	Jul 28, 2026 Jay Clayton DNI 51–47	Aug 8, 2026 Todd Blanche Justice 50–49
Alabama	Tommy Tuberville	R	Yea	Yea	Yea	Yea	Yea	Yea	Yea	Yea
Alabama	Katie Britt	R	Yea	Yea	Yea	Yea	Yea	Yea	Yea	Yea
Alaska	Lisa Murkowski	R	Yea	Yea	Yea	Yea	Yea	Yea	Yea	Nay
Alaska	Dan Sullivan	R	No vote	No vote	Yea	Yea	Yea	Yea	Yea	Yea
Arizona	Mark Kelly	D	Nay	Nay	Nay	Nay	Yea	Nay	Nay	Nay
Arizona	Ruben Gallego	D	Nay	Nay	Nay	Nay	Yea	No vote	Nay	Nay
Arkansas	John Boozman	R	Yea	Yea	Yea	Yea	Yea	Yea	Yea	Yea
Arkansas	Tom Cotton	R	Yea	Yea	Yea	Yea	Yea	Yea	Yea	Yea
California	Alex Padilla	D	Nay	Nay	Nay	Nay	Nay	Nay	Nay	Nay
California	Adam Schiff	D	Nay	Nay	Nay	Nay	Yea	Nay	Nay	Nay
Colorado	Michael Bennet	D	Nay	Nay	Nay	Nay	Yea	Nay	Nay	Nay
Colorado	John Hickenlooper	D	Nay	Nay	Yea	Nay	Yea	Nay	Nay	Nay
Connecticut	Richard Blumenthal	D	Nay	Nay	Nay	Nay	Nay	Nay	Nay	Nay
Connecticut	Chris Murphy	D	Nay	Nay	Nay	Nay	Nay	Nay	Nay	Nay
Delaware	Chris Coons	D	Nay	Nay	Nay	Nay	Nay	Nay	Nay	Nay
Delaware	Lisa Blunt Rochester	D	Nay	Nay	Nay	Nay	Nay	Nay	Nay	Nay
Florida	Rick Scott	R	Yea	Yea	Yea	Yea	Yea	Yea	Yea	Yea
Florida	Ashley Moody	R	Yea	Yea	Yea	Yea	Yea	Yea	Yea	Yea
Georgia	Jon Ossoff	D	Nay	Nay	Nay	Nay	Yea	Nay	Nay	Nay
Georgia	Raphael Warnock	D	Nay	Nay	Nay	Nay	Yea	Nay	Nay	Nay
Hawaii	Brian Schatz	D	Nay	Nay	Nay	Nay	Nay	Nay	Nay	Nay
Hawaii	Mazie Hirono	D	Nay	Nay	Nay	Nay	Nay	Nay	Nay	Nay
Idaho	Mike Crapo	R	Yea	Yea	Yea	Yea	Yea	Yea	Yea	Yea
Idaho	Jim Risch	R	Yea	Yea	Yea	Yea	Yea	Yea	Yea	Yea
Illinois	Dick Durbin	D	Nay	Nay	Nay	Nay	Nay	Nay	Nay	Nay
Illinois	Tammy Duckworth	D	Nay	Nay	Nay	Nay	Nay	Nay	Nay	Nay
Indiana	Todd Young	R	Yea	Yea	Yea	Yea	Yea	Yea	Yea	Yea
Indiana	Jim Banks	R	Yea	Yea	Yea	Yea	Yea	Yea	Yea	Yea
Iowa	Chuck Grassley	R	Yea	Yea	Yea	Yea	Yea	Yea	Yea	Yea
Iowa	Joni Ernst	R	Yea	Yea	Yea	Yea	Yea	Yea	Yea	Yea
Kansas	Jerry Moran	R	No vote	No vote	Yea	Yea	Yea	Yea	Yea	Yea
Kansas	Roger Marshall	R	Yea	Yea	Yea	Yea	Yea	Yea	Yea	Yea
Kentucky	Mitch McConnell	R	Yea	Yea	Yea	Yea	Nay	Yea	No vote	No vote
Kentucky	Rand Paul	R	Yea	Yea	Nay	Yea	Nay	Nay	Yea	Yea
Louisiana	Bill Cassidy	R	Yea	Yea	Yea	Yea	Yea	Yea	Yea	Yea
Louisiana	John Kennedy	R	Yea	Yea	Yea	Yea	Yea	Yea	Yea	Yea
Maine	Susan Collins	R	Yea	Yea	Yea	Yea	Yea	Yea	Yea	Nay
Maine	Angus King	I-D	Nay	Nay	Nay	Nay	Nay	Nay	Nay	Nay
Maryland	Chris Van Hollen	D	Nay	Nay	Nay	Nay	Nay	Nay	Nay	Nay
Maryland	Angela Alsobrooks	D	Nay	Nay	Nay	Nay	Nay	Nay	Nay	Nay
Massachusetts	Elizabeth Warren	D	Nay	Nay	Nay	Nay	Nay	Nay	Nay	Nay
Massachusetts	Ed Markey	D	Nay	Nay	Nay	Nay	Nay	Nay	Nay	Nay
Michigan	Gary Peters	D	No vote	Nay	Yea	Nay	Yea	Nay	Nay	Nay
Michigan	Elissa Slotkin	D	Nay	Nay	Yea	No vote	Yea	Nay	Nay	Nay
Minnesota	Amy Klobuchar	D	Nay	Nay	Nay	Nay	Yea	Nay	Nay	Nay
Minnesota	Tina Smith	D	Nay	Nay	Nay	Nay	Nay	Nay	Nay	Nay
Mississippi	Roger Wicker	R	Yea	Yea	Yea	Yea	Yea	Yea	Yea	Yea
Mississippi	Cindy Hyde-Smith	R	Yea	Yea	Yea	Yea	Yea	Yea	Yea	Yea
Missouri	Josh Hawley	R	Yea	Yea	Yea	Yea	Yea	Yea	Yea	Yea
Missouri	Eric Schmitt	R	Yea	Yea	Yea	Yea	Yea	Yea	Yea	Yea
Montana	Steve Daines	R	Yea	Yea	Yea	Yea	Yea	Yea	Yea	Yea
Montana	Tim Sheehy	R	Yea	Yea	Yea	Yea	Yea	Yea	Yea	Yea
Nebraska	Deb Fischer	R	Yea	Yea	Yea	Yea	Yea	Yea	Yea	Yea
Nebraska	Pete Ricketts	R	Yea	Yea	Yea	Yea	Yea	Yea	Yea	Yea
Nevada	Catherine Cortez Masto	D	Nay	Nay	Nay	Nay	Yea	Nay	Nay	Nay
Nevada	Jacky Rosen	D	Nay	Yea	Nay	Nay	Yea	Nay	Nay	Nay
New Hampshire	Jeanne Shaheen	D	Nay	Nay	Nay	Nay	Yea	Nay	Nay	Nay
New Hampshire	Maggie Hassan	D	Nay	Nay	Nay	Nay	Yea	Nay	Nay	Nay
New Jersey	Cory Booker	D	No vote	Nay	Nay	Nay	Nay	Nay	Nay	Nay
New Jersey	Andy Kim	D	Nay	Nay	Nay	Nay	Nay	Nay	Nay	Nay
New Mexico	Martin Heinrich	D	Nay	Nay	Nay	Nay	Nay	Yea	Nay	Nay
New Mexico	Ben Ray Luján	D	Nay	Nay	Nay	Nay	Nay	Nay	Nay	Nay
New York	Chuck Schumer	D	Nay	Nay	Nay	Nay	Nay	Nay	Nay	Nay
New York	Kirsten Gillibrand	D	Nay	Nay	Nay	Nay	Nay	Nay	Nay	Nay
North Carolina	Thom Tillis	R	Yea	Yea	Yea	Yea	Yea	Yea	Yea	Yea
North Carolina	Ted Budd	R	Yea	Yea	Yea	Yea	Nay	Yea	Yea	Yea
North Dakota	John Hoeven	R	Yea	Yea	Yea	Yea	Yea	Yea	Yea	Yea
North Dakota	Kevin Cramer	R	Yea	Yea	No vote	Yea	Yea	Yea	Yea	Yea
Ohio	Bernie Moreno	R	Yea	Yea	Yea	Yea	Yea	Yea	Yea	Yea
Ohio	Jon Husted	R	Yea	Yea	Yea	Yea	Yea	Yea	Yea	Yea
Oklahoma	James Lankford	R	Yea	Yea	Yea	Yea	Yea	Yea	Yea	Yea
Oklahoma	Markwayne Mullin	R	Yea	Yea	Yea	Yea	Yea	Yea (Note: Mullin was still serving in the Senate when he voted to confirm himself. Armstrong was appointed to fill the vacancy on March 24, 2026.)	—	
Oklahoma	Alan Armstrong	R	—						Yea	Yea
Oregon	Ron Wyden	D	Nay	Nay	Nay	Nay	Nay	Nay	Nay	Nay
Oregon	Jeff Merkley	D	Nay	Nay	Nay	Nay	Nay	Nay	Nay	Nay
Pennsylvania	John Fetterman	D	Nay	Nay	Yea	Nay	No vote	Yea	Nay	Nay
Pennsylvania	Dave McCormick	R	Yea	Yea	Yea	Yea	Yea	Yea	Yea	Yea
Rhode Island	Jack Reed	D	Nay	Nay	Nay	Nay	Nay	Nay	Nay	Nay
Rhode Island	Sheldon Whitehouse	D	Nay	Nay	Yea	Nay	Yea	Nay	Nay	Nay
South Carolina	Tim Scott	R	Yea	Yea	Yea	Yea	Yea	Yea	Yea	Yea
South Carolina	Lindsey Graham	R	Yea	Yea	Yea	Yea	Yea	Yea	— (Note: Lindsey Graham passed away on July 11, 2026. Darline Graham, his sister, was appointed to fill the vacancy on July 13, 2026.)	
South Carolina	Darline Graham	R	—						No vote	Yea
South Dakota	John Thune	R	Yea	Yea	Yea	Yea	Yea	Yea	Yea	Yea
South Dakota	Mike Rounds	R	Yea	Yea	Yea	Yea	Yea	Yea	Yea	Yea
Tennessee	Marsha Blackburn	R	Yea	Yea	Yea	Yea	Yea	Yea	Yea	Yea
Tennessee	Bill Hagerty	R	Yea	Yea	Yea	Yea	Yea	Yea	Yea	Yea
Texas	John Cornyn	R	Yea	Yea	Yea	Yea	Yea	Yea	Yea	Yea
Texas	Ted Cruz	R	Yea	Yea	Yea	Yea	Yea	Yea	Yea	Yea
Utah	Mike Lee	R	Yea	Yea	Yea	Yea	Yea	Yea	Yea	Yea
Utah	John Curtis	R	Yea	Yea	Yea	Yea	Yea	Yea	Yea	Yea
Vermont	Bernie Sanders	I-D	Nay	Nay	Nay	Nay	Nay	Nay	Nay	Nay
Vermont	Peter Welch	D	Nay	Nay	Nay	No vote	Nay	Nay	Nay	Nay
Virginia	Mark Warner	D	Nay	Nay	Nay	Nay	Yea	Nay	Nay	Nay
Virginia	Tim Kaine	D	Nay	Nay	Nay	Nay	Yea	Nay	Nay	Nay
Washington	Patty Murray	D	Nay	Nay	Nay	Nay	Nay	Nay	Nay	Nay
Washington	Maria Cantwell	D	Nay	Nay	Nay	Nay	Nay	Nay	Nay	Nay
West Virginia	Shelley Moore Capito	R	Yea	Yea	Yea	No vote	Yea	Yea	Yea	Yea
West Virginia	Jim Justice	R	Yea	Yea	Yea	Yea	Yea	Yea	Yea	Yea
Wisconsin	Ron Johnson	R	Yea	Yea	Yea	Yea	Yea	Yea	Yea	Yea
Wisconsin	Tammy Baldwin	D	Nay	Nay	Nay	Nay	Yea	Nay	Nay	Nay
Wyoming	John Barrasso	R	Yea	Yea	Yea	Yea	Yea	Yea	Yea	Yea
Wyoming	Cynthia Lummis	R	Yea	Yea	Yea	No vote	Yea	Yea	Yea	Yea
	vote by party	R D Ind.	51–0 (2 NV); 0–43 (2 NV); 0–2; Lutnick	51–0 (2 NV); 1–44; 0–2; Loeffler	51–1 (1 NV); 5–40; 0–2; Greer	51–0 (2 NV); 0–43 (2 NV); 0–2; McMahon	50–3; 17–27 (1 NV); 0–2; Chavez-DeRemer	52–1; 2–42 (1 NV); 0–2; Mullin	51–0 (2 NV); 0–45; 0–2; Clayton	50–2 (1 NV); 0–45; 0–2; Blanche

State	Senator	Party	Sep 30, 2026 Keith Sonderling Labor 47–41
Alabama	Tommy Tuberville	R	Yea
Alabama	Katie Britt	R	Yea
Alaska	Lisa Murkowski	R	Yea
Alaska	Dan Sullivan	R	Yea
Arizona	Mark Kelly	D	Nay
Arizona	Ruben Gallego	D	Nay
Arkansas	John Boozman	R	Yea
Arkansas	Tom Cotton	R	Yea
California	Alex Padilla	D	Nay
California	Adam Schiff	D	Nay
Colorado	Michael Bennet	D	Nay
Colorado	John Hickenlooper	D	Nay
Connecticut	Richard Blumenthal	D	No vote
Connecticut	Chris Murphy	D	Nay
Delaware	Chris Coons	D	Nay
Delaware	Lisa Blunt Rochester	D	Nay
Florida	Rick Scott	R	Yea
Florida	Ashley Moody	R	Yea
Georgia	Jon Ossoff	D	Nay
Georgia	Raphael Warnock	D	Nay
Hawaii	Brian Schatz	D	Nay
Hawaii	Mazie Hirono	D	Nay
Idaho	Mike Crapo	R	Yea
Idaho	Jim Risch	R	Yea
Illinois	Dick Durbin	D	No vote
Illinois	Tammy Duckworth	D	Nay
Indiana	Todd Young	R	Yea
Indiana	Jim Banks	R	Yea
Iowa	Chuck Grassley	R	Yea
Iowa	Joni Ernst	R	No vote
Kansas	Jerry Moran	R	No vote
Kansas	Roger Marshall	R	Yea
Kentucky	Mitch McConnell	R	No vote
Kentucky	Rand Paul	R	Yea
Louisiana	Bill Cassidy	R	Yea
Louisiana	John Kennedy	R	Yea
Maine	Susan Collins	R	Yea
Maine	Angus King	I-D	Nay
Maryland	Chris Van Hollen	D	Nay
Maryland	Angela Alsobrooks	D	Nay
Massachusetts	Elizabeth Warren	D	Nay
Massachusetts	Ed Markey	D	Nay
Michigan	Gary Peters	D	Nay
Michigan	Elissa Slotkin	D	Nay
Minnesota	Amy Klobuchar	D	Nay
Minnesota	Tina Smith	D	No vote
Mississippi	Roger Wicker	R	Yea
Mississippi	Cindy Hyde-Smith	R	Yea
Missouri	Josh Hawley	R	Yea
Missouri	Eric Schmitt	R	Yea
Montana	Steve Daines	R	Yea
Montana	Tim Sheehy	R	Yea
Nebraska	Deb Fischer	R	Yea
Nebraska	Pete Ricketts	R	Yea
Nevada	Catherine Cortez Masto	D	Nay
Nevada	Jacky Rosen	D	Nay
New Hampshire	Jeanne Shaheen	D	Nay
New Hampshire	Maggie Hassan	D	Nay
New Jersey	Cory Booker	D	Nay
New Jersey	Andy Kim	D	Nay
New Mexico	Martin Heinrich	D	Nay
New Mexico	Ben Ray Luján	D	Nay
New York	Chuck Schumer	D	Nay
New York	Kirsten Gillibrand	D	No vote
North Carolina	Thom Tillis	R	No vote
North Carolina	Ted Budd	R	Yea
North Dakota	John Hoeven	R	Yea
North Dakota	Kevin Cramer	R	Yea
Ohio	Bernie Moreno	R	Yea
Ohio	Jon Husted	R	Yea
Oklahoma	James Lankford	R	Yea
Oklahoma	Alan Armstrong	R	Yea
Oregon	Ron Wyden	D	Nay
Oregon	Jeff Merkley	D	Nay
Pennsylvania	John Fetterman	D	Nay
Pennsylvania	Dave McCormick	R	Yea
Rhode Island	Jack Reed	D	Nay
Rhode Island	Sheldon Whitehouse	D	No vote
South Carolina	Tim Scott	R	Yea
South Carolina	Darline Graham	R	Yea
South Dakota	John Thune	R	Yea
South Dakota	Mike Rounds	R	Yea
Tennessee	Marsha Blackburn	R	No vote
Tennessee	Bill Hagerty	R	Yea
Texas	John Cornyn	R	No vote
Texas	Ted Cruz	R	Yea
Utah	Mike Lee	R	Yea
Utah	John Curtis	R	Yea
Vermont	Bernie Sanders	I-D	Nay
Vermont	Peter Welch	D	Nay
Virginia	Mark Warner	D	No vote
Virginia	Tim Kaine	D	Nay
Washington	Patty Murray	D	Nay
Washington	Maria Cantwell	D	Nay
West Virginia	Shelley Moore Capito	R	Yea
West Virginia	Jim Justice	R	Yea
Wisconsin	Ron Johnson	R	Yea
Wisconsin	Tammy Baldwin	D	Nay
Wyoming	John Barrasso	R	Yea
Wyoming	Cynthia Lummis	R	Yea
	vote by party	R D Ind.	47–0 (6 NV); 0–39 (6 NV); 0–2; Sonderling

Affiliation: D denotes Democratic, R denotes Republican, and I-D denotes an independent who caucuses with Democrats.
Notes: — = not a Senator during this vote; NV = Not Voting; Pres = Present; VP: Y/N = Vice President voted Yea or Nay

==== Committee process ====
Office	Nominee	State	Announced	Committee	Hearing date(s)	Committee vote result	Committee vote date	Cloture vote result	Cloture vote date	Floor vote result	Floor vote date	Assumed office
Secretary of State	Marco Rubio	FL	Nov 13, 2024	Foreign Relations	Jan 15, 2025	22–0	Jan 20, 2025	N/A	N/A	99–0	Jan 20, 2025	Jan 21, 2025
Secretary of the Treasury	Scott Bessent	SC	Nov 22, 2024	Finance	Jan 16, 2025	16–11	Jan 21, 2025	67–23	Jan 25, 2025	68–29	Jan 27, 2025	Jan 28, 2025
Secretary of Defense	Pete Hegseth	TN	Nov 12, 2024	Armed Services	Jan 14, 2025	14–13	Jan 20, 2025	51–49 (Note: A procedural vote to move Hegseth's nomination forward passed 53–45 on January 21, 2025.)	Jan 23, 2025	51–50 (Note: Vice President JD Vance provided the tie-breaking vote.)	Jan 24, 2025	Jan 25, 2025
Attorney General	Matt Gaetz	FL	Nov 13, 2024	Judiciary	Withdrawal announced on November 21, 2024, prior to being submitted to the Senate.							
Attorney General	Pam Bondi	FL	Nov 21, 2024	Judiciary	Jan 15, 2025 – Jan 16, 2025	12–10	Jan 29, 2025	52–46	Feb 3, 2025	54–46	Feb 4, 2025	Feb 5, 2025
Attorney General	Todd Blanche	FL	Jun 3, 2026	Judiciary	Jul 15, 2026 – Jul 16, 2026	12–10	Aug 4, 2026	50–49	Aug 8, 2026	50–49	Aug 8, 2026	Aug 10, 2026
Secretary of the Interior	Doug Burgum	ND	Nov 14, 2024	Energy and Natural Resources	Jan 16, 2025	18–2	Jan 23, 2025	78–20	Jan 29, 2025	80–17	Jan 30, 2025	Feb 1, 2025
Secretary of Agriculture	Brooke Rollins	TX	Nov 23, 2024	Agriculture, Nutrition and Forestry	Jan 23, 2025	23–0	Feb 3, 2025	N/A (Note: A procedural vote to move Rollins's nomination forward passed 52–46 on February 6, 2025.)	N/A	72–28	Feb 13, 2025	Feb 13, 2025
Secretary of Commerce	Howard Lutnick	NY	Nov 19, 2024	Commerce, Science and Transportation	Jan 29, 2025	16–12	Feb 5, 2025	52–45 (Note: A procedural vote to move Lutnick's nomination forward passed 52–46 on February 6, 2025.)	Feb 13, 2025	51–45	Feb 18, 2025	Feb 21, 2025
Secretary of Labor	Lori Chavez-DeRemer	OR	Nov 22, 2024	Health, Education, Labor and Pensions	Feb 19, 2025	14–9	Feb 27, 2025	66–30	Mar 6, 2025	67–32	Mar 10, 2025	Mar 11, 2025
Secretary of Labor	Keith Sonderling	FL	Jun 29, 2026	Health, Education, Labor and Pensions	Jul 16, 2026	12–11	Jul 30, 2026	53–47	Sep 30, 2026	47–41	Sep 30, 2026	Oct 2, 2026
Secretary of Health and Human Services	Robert F. Kennedy Jr.	CA	Nov 14, 2024	Finance	Jan 29, 2025	14–13	Feb 4, 2025	53–47 (Note: A procedural vote to move Kennedy's nomination forward passed 52–47 on February 6, 2025.)	Feb 12, 2025	52–48	Feb 13, 2025	Feb 13, 2025
Secretary of Health and Human Services	Robert F. Kennedy Jr.	CA	Nov 14, 2024	Health, Education, Labor and Pensions	Jan 30, 2025	Consultative		53–47	Feb 12, 2025	52–48	Feb 13, 2025	Feb 13, 2025
Secretary of Housing and Urban Development	Scott Turner	TX	Nov 22, 2024	Banking, Housing and Urban Affairs	Jan 16, 2025	13–11	Jan 23, 2025	55–45	Feb 4, 2025	55–44	Feb 5, 2025	Feb 5, 2025
Secretary of Transportation	Sean Duffy	WI	Nov 18, 2024	Commerce, Science and Transportation	Jan 15, 2025	28–0	Jan 22, 2025	97–0	Jan 27, 2025	77–22	Jan 28, 2025	Jan 28, 2025
Secretary of Energy	Chris Wright	CO	Nov 16, 2024	Energy and Natural Resources	Jan 15, 2025	15–5	Jan 23, 2025	62–35	Jan 30, 2025	59–38	Feb 3, 2025	Feb 3, 2025
Secretary of Education	Linda McMahon	CT	Nov 19, 2024	Health, Education, Labor and Pensions	Feb 13, 2025	12–11	Feb 20, 2025	51–47 (Note: A procedural vote to move McMahon's nomination forward passed 51–47 on February 25, 2025.)	Feb 27, 2025	51–45	Mar 3, 2025	Mar 3, 2025
Secretary of Veterans Affairs	Doug Collins	GA	Nov 14, 2024	Veterans' Affairs	Jan 21, 2025	18–1	Jan 23, 2025	83–13	Jan 30, 2025	77–23	Feb 4, 2025	Feb 5, 2025
Secretary of Homeland Security	Kristi Noem	SD	Nov 12, 2024	Homeland Security and Governmental Affairs	Jan 17, 2025	13–2	Jan 20, 2025	61–39	Jan 24, 2025	59–34	Jan 25, 2025	Jan 25, 2025
Secretary of Homeland Security	Markwayne Mullin	OK	Mar 5, 2026	Homeland Security and Governmental Affairs	Mar 18, 2026	8–7	Mar 19, 2026	54–37	Mar 22, 2026	54–45	Mar 23, 2026	Mar 24, 2026
Administrator of the Environmental Protection Agency	Lee Zeldin	NY	Nov 11, 2024	Environment and Public Works	Jan 16, 2025	11–8	Jan 23, 2025	56–42	Jan 29, 2025	56–42	Jan 29, 2025	Jan 29, 2025
Director of the Office of Management and Budget	Russell Vought	VA	Nov 22, 2024	Budget	Jan 22, 2025	11–0 (Note: All Democratic members boycotted the vote.)	Jan 30, 2025	53–47 (Note: A procedural vote to move Vought's nomination forward passed 51–46 on February 3, 2025.)	Feb 5, 2025	53–47 (Note: A motion to table the reconsideration of Vought's nomination passed 52–47 on February 6, 2025.)	Feb 6, 2025	Feb 7, 2025
Director of the Office of Management and Budget	Russell Vought	VA	Nov 22, 2024	Homeland Security and Governmental Affairs	Jan 15, 2025	8–7	Jan 20, 2025	53–47	Feb 5, 2025	53–47	Feb 6, 2025	Feb 7, 2025
Director of National Intelligence	Tulsi Gabbard	HI	Nov 13, 2024	Intelligence	Jan 30, 2025	9–8	Feb 4, 2025	52–46 (Note: A procedural vote to move Gabbard's nomination forward passed 52–46 on February 6, 2025.)	Feb 10, 2025	52–48	Feb 12, 2025	Feb 12, 2025
Director of National Intelligence	Jay Clayton	NY	Jun 11, 2026	Intelligence	Jul 15, 2026	9–8	Jul 21, 2026	51–43	Jul 27, 2026	51–47	Jul 28, 2026	Aug 3, 2026
Director of the Central Intelligence Agency	John Ratcliffe	TX	Nov 12, 2024	Intelligence	Jan 15, 2025	14–3	Jan 20, 2025	72–26	Jan 23, 2025	74–25	Jan 23, 2025	Jan 23, 2025
Trade Representative	Jamieson Greer	MD	Nov 26, 2024	Finance	Feb 6, 2025	15–12	Feb 12, 2025	54–43	Feb 24, 2025	56–43	Feb 26, 2025	Feb 27, 2025
Administrator of the Small Business Administration	Kelly Loeffler	GA	Dec 4, 2024	Small Business and Entrepreneurship	Jan 29, 2025	12–7	Feb 5, 2025	51–43 (Note: A procedural vote to move Loeffler's nomination forward passed 53–45 on February 6, 2025.)	Feb 13, 2025	52–46	Feb 19, 2025	Feb 20, 2025

== Elected officials ==
=== President ===
Donald Trump defeated the incumbent vice president and Democratic nominee, Kamala Harris, in the 2024 presidential election, receiving 312 electoral votes compared to Harris's 226; he won every swing state in addition to holding on to all of the states that he won in 2020. The formal certification of the results took place on January 6, 2025. He assumed office on January 20, 2025.

President of the United States
Portrait	Name	Date of birth	State	Background	Reference
	Donald Trump	June 14, 1946 (age 80)	Florida	45th president of the United States (2017–2021); Owner of Trump Media & Technology Group (2021–present); Owner of the Trump Organization (1971–present; Chairman 1971–2017); Chairman of the Kennedy Center (2025–present); Host and executive producer of The Apprentice (2004–2015)	

=== Vice President ===
The vice president is the only cabinet member to be elected to the position. The vice president does not require Senate confirmation, and does not serve at the pleasure of the president. There were dozens of potential running mates for Trump who received media speculation. Trump's eventual pick of Senator JD Vance (R-OH) was officially announced on July 15, 2024, and confirmed by acclamation via parliamentary procedure amongst delegates to the 2024 Republican National Convention on July 15, 2024.

United States senator JD Vance (R-OH) was elected Vice President of the United States on November 5, 2024. He received 312 electoral votes while the governor of Minnesota, Tim Walz, received 226. The formal certification of the results took place on January 6, 2025. He assumed office on January 20, 2025. Vance is the third-youngest vice president in U.S. history.

Vice President of the United States
Portrait	Name	Date of birth	State	Background	Reference
	JD Vance	August 2, 1984 (age 42)	Ohio	United States senator from Ohio (2023–2025); Author of Hillbilly Elegy (2016 – later adapted into a film); Corporal in the United States Marine Corps (2003–2007)	

== Selected candidates for Cabinet positions ==
The following cabinet positions are listed in order of their creation (also used as the basis for the United States presidential line of succession).

=== Secretary of State ===
A nomination for Secretary of State is reviewed during hearings held by the members of the Foreign Relations Committee, then presented to the full Senate for a vote. Senator Marco Rubio from Florida was announced as President-elect Trump's nominee for the position on November 13, 2024. He was confirmed 99–0 by the Senate on January 20, 2025, and sworn in the next day.

Secretary of State
Portrait	Name	Date of birth	State	Background	Reference
	Marco Rubio	May 28, 1971 (age 55)	Florida	Vice chair of the Senate Intelligence Committee (2021–2025); Chair of the Senate Intelligence Committee (2020–2021) (Acting); Chair of the Senate Small Business Committee (2019–2021); Candidate for president of the United States in 2016; U.S. senator from Florida (2011–2025); 94th speaker of the Florida House of Representatives (2006–2008); Florida state representative from the 111th district (2000–2008); Member of the West Miami City Commission (1998–2000)	

=== Secretary of the Treasury ===
A nomination for Secretary of the Treasury is reviewed during hearings held by the members of the Finance Committee, then presented to the full Senate for a vote. Investor and hedge fund manager Scott Bessent from South Carolina, founder of the global macro investment firm Key Square Group, was announced as Trump's nominee for the position on November 22, 2024. He was confirmed 68–29 by the Senate on January 27, 2025, and sworn in the next day.

Secretary of the Treasury
Portrait	Name	Date of birth	State	Background	Reference
	Scott Bessent	August 21, 1962 (age 62)	South Carolina	Founder of Key Square Group (2015–2025); Economic advisor for Donald Trump's 2024 presidential campaign; Chief Investment Officer of Soros Fund Management (2011–2015)	

=== Secretary of Defense ===
A nomination for Secretary of Defense is reviewed during hearings held by the members of the Armed Services Committee, then presented to the full Senate for a vote. Major Pete Hegseth from Tennessee, a Fox News political commentator, was announced as Trump's nominee for the position on November 12, 2024. He was confirmed 51–50 by the Senate on January 24, 2025, and sworn in the next day. On September 5, 2025, President Trump's signed an executive order authorizing "secretary of war" as a secondary title. However, only an act of Congress can formally and legally change the name of the position.

Secretary of Defense
Portrait	Name	Date of birth	State	Background	Reference
	Pete Hegseth	June 6, 1980 (age 46)	Tennessee	Fox News personality (2014–2024); Candidate for U.S. senator from Minnesota in 2012; Executive Director of Vets For Freedom (2007–2012); Major in the Army National Guard (2003–2014; 2019–2021)	

=== Attorney General ===
A nomination for Attorney General is reviewed during hearings held by the members of the Judiciary Committee, then presented to the full Senate for a vote.

==== Failed nomination of Matt Gaetz ====
On November 13, 2024, Representative Matt Gaetz was selected to be attorney general, though Gaetz withdrew his name on November 21, 2024 after many Senate Republicans stated that he did not have enough votes to be confirmed.

==== Pam Bondi (2025–2026) ====
On November 21, 2024, President-elect Trump selected former state attorney general Pam Bondi of Florida as his new nominee for the position. She was confirmed 54–46 by the Senate on February 4, 2025, and sworn in the next day.

Bondi was fired on April 2, 2026, and replaced by Todd Blanche in the interim.

Attorney General
Portrait	Name	Date of birth	State	Background	Reference
	Pam Bondi	November 19, 1965 (age 60)	Florida	Chief Legal Officer of the America First Policy Institute (2024–present); Member of the Kennedy Center Board of Trustees (2020–present); 37th attorney general of Florida (2011–2019); Hillsborough County assistant state attorney (1994–2009)	

==== Todd Blanche (2026–present) ====
Todd Blanche, the deputy attorney general, became acting attorney general when Pam Bondi's tenure ended on April 2, 2026.

Blanche was confirmed 50–49 by the Senate on August 8, 2026, and sworn in two days later.

Attorney General
Portrait	Name	Date of birth	State	Background	Reference
	Todd Blanche	August 6, 1974 (age 52)	Florida	40th United States Deputy Attorney General (2025–2026); Acting Librarian of Congress (2025–present); Partner at Cadwalader, Wickersham & Taft (2017–2025); Lawyer at WilmerHale (2014–2017); Assistant U.S. attorney for S.D.N.Y. (2006–2014)	

=== Secretary of the Interior ===
A nomination for Secretary of the Interior is reviewed during hearings held by the members of the Energy and Natural Resources Committee, then presented to the full Senate for a vote. Governor Doug Burgum of North Dakota was announced as Trump's nominee for the position on November 15, 2024. He was confirmed 79–18 by the Senate on January 30, 2025, and sworn in the next day.

Secretary of the Interior
Portrait	Name	Date of birth	State	Background	Reference
	Doug Burgum	August 1, 1956 (age 70)	North Dakota	Governor of North Dakota (2016–2024); Candidate for president of the United States in 2024; Senior vice president of Microsoft Business Solutions Group (2001–2007); President of Great Plains Software (1984–2001); Founder of Arthur Ventures & Kilbourne Group; Board chairman of Atlassian and SuccessFactors	

=== Secretary of Agriculture ===
A nomination for Secretary of Agriculture is reviewed during hearings held by the members of the Agriculture, Nutrition, and Forestry Committee, then presented to the full Senate for a vote. Former acting DPC director Brooke Rollins from Texas was announced as Trump's nominee for the position on November 23, 2024. She was confirmed 72–28 by the Senate on February 13, 2025, and sworn in the same day.

Secretary of Agriculture
Portrait	Name	Date of birth	State	Background	Reference
	Brooke Rollins	April 10, 1972 (age 54)	Texas	President and CEO of America First Policy Institute (2021–present); Director of the Domestic Policy Council (2020–2021) (Acting); Assistant to the President for Intergovernmental and Technology Initiatives (2018–2020); President and CEO of Texas Public Policy Foundation (2003–2018)	

=== Secretary of Commerce ===
A nomination for Secretary of Commerce is reviewed during hearings held by the members of the Commerce, Science, and Transportation Committee, then presented to the full Senate for a vote. Businessman Howard Lutnick from New York, Chairman, CEO & President of Cantor Fitzgerald, was announced as Trump's nominee for the position on November 19, 2024. He was confirmed 51–45 by the Senate on February 18, 2025, and sworn in on February 21, 2025.

Secretary of Commerce
Portrait	Name	Date of birth	State	Background	Reference
	Howard Lutnick	July 14, 1961 (age 65)	New York	President and CEO of Cantor Fitzgerald (1991–present); Chairman of Cantor Fitzgerald (1996–present); Chairman and CEO of BGC Group (2004–present)	

=== Secretary of Labor ===
A nomination for Secretary of Labor is reviewed during hearings held by the members of the Health, Education, Labor, and Pensions Committee, then presented to the full Senate for a vote.

==== Lori Chavez-DeRemer (2025–2026) ====
On November 22, 2024, President-elect Trump selected Representative Lori Chavez-DeRemer from Oregon as his nominee for Labor Secretary. She was confirmed 67–32 by the Senate on March 10, 2025, and sworn in the next day.

On Monday, April 20, 2026, White House communications director Steven Cheung announced on X that Chavez-DeRemer would be resigning from the Administration to take a position in the private sector. According to the Associated Press, "He said Keith Sonderling, the current deputy labor secretary, would become acting labor secretary in her place."

Secretary of Labor
Portrait	Name	Date of birth	State	Background	Reference
	Lori Chavez-DeRemer	April 7, 1968 (age 56)	Oregon	U.S. representative from OR-5 (2023–2025); Mayor of Happy Valley, Oregon (2011–2019); Member of the Happy Valley City Council (2005–2011)	

==== Keith Sonderling (2026–present) ====
Keith Sonderling, Deputy Secretary of Labor, became acting Secretary when Lori Chavez-DeRemer resigned on April 20, 2026.

Sonderling was confirmed 47–41 by the Senate on September 30, 2026, and sworn in on October 2, 2026.

Secretary of Labor
Portrait	Name	Date of birth	State	Background	Reference
	Keith Sonderling	November 25, 1982 (age 43)	Florida	38th United States Deputy Secretary of Labor; Member of the Equal Employment Opportunity Commission	

=== Secretary of Health and Human Services ===
Although historically the nominee also holds meetings with the Health, Education, Labor, and Pensions Committee, officially a nomination for Secretary of Health and Human Services is reviewed during hearings held by the members of the United States Senate Committee on Finance, then presented to the full Senate for a vote. 2024 independent presidential candidate Robert F. Kennedy Jr. from California was announced as Trump's nominee for the position on November 14, 2024. He was confirmed 52–48 by the Senate on February 13, 2025, and sworn in the same day.

Secretary of Health and Human Services
Portrait	Name	Date of birth	State	Background	Reference
	Robert F. Kennedy Jr.	January 17, 1954 (age 72)	California	Candidate for president of the United States in 2024; Chairman of Children's Health Defense (2015–2023); Founder and president of Waterkeeper Alliance (1999–2020); Director and Supervising Attorney of the Pace University Environmental Litigation Clinic (1987–2017)	

=== Secretary of Housing and Urban Development ===
A nomination for Secretary of Housing and Urban Development is reviewed during hearings held by the members of the Banking, Housing, and Urban Affairs Committee, then presented to the full Senate for a vote. The president-elect announced the nomination of former state representative Scott Turner from Texas on November 22, 2024. He was confirmed 55–44 by the Senate on February 5, 2025, and sworn in the same day.

Secretary of Housing and Urban Development
Portrait	Name	Date of birth	State	Background	Reference
	Scott Turner	February 26, 1972 (age 54)	Texas	Executive Director of the White House Opportunity and Revitalization Council (2019–2021); Texas state representative from the 33rd district (2013–2017); NFL cornerback (1995–2001, 2003)	

=== Secretary of Transportation ===
A nomination for Secretary of Transportation is reviewed during hearings held by the members of the Commerce, Science, and Transportation Committee, and then presented to the full Senate for a vote. Former representative and former prosecutor Sean Duffy from Wisconsin was announced as Trump's nominee for the position on November 18, 2024. Elon Musk and other Silicon Valley executives had encouraged Trump to pick Emil Michael for the role. He was confirmed 77–22 by the Senate on January 28, 2025, and sworn in the same day.

Secretary of Transportation
Portrait	Name	Date of birth	State	Background	Reference
	Sean Duffy	October 3, 1971 (age 55)	Wisconsin	Cable news personality (CNN 2019–2020; Fox News / Fox Business 2020–2024); Chair of the House Financial Services Subcommittee on Oversight and Investigations (2015–2017); U.S. representative from WI-7 (2011–2019); District Attorney of Ashland County (2002–2010)	

=== Secretary of Energy ===
The nomination of a secretary-designate is reviewed during hearings held by the members of the Energy and Natural Resources Committee, then presented to the full Senate for a vote. Engineer and businessman Chris Wright from Colorado, Chairman, CEO, and Founder of Liberty Energy, was announced as Trump's nominee for the position on November 15, 2024. He was confirmed 59–38 by the Senate on February 3, 2025, and sworn in the same day.

Secretary of Energy
Portrait	Name	Date of birth	State	Background	Reference
	Chris Wright	January 15, 1965 (age 61)	Colorado	Founder, CEO, and chairman of Liberty Energy (2011–present); Chairman of Stroud Energy (1994–2006); Founder & CEO of Pinnacle Technologies (1992–2006)	

=== Secretary of Education ===
A nomination for Secretary of Education is reviewed during hearings held by the members of the Health, Education, Labor, and Pensions Committee, then presented to the full Senate for a vote. Former SBA administrator Linda McMahon from Connecticut was announced as Trump's nominee for the position on November 19, 2024. She was confirmed 51–45 by the Senate on March 3, 2025, and sworn in the same day.

Secretary of Education
Portrait	Name	Date of birth	State	Background	Reference
	Linda McMahon	October 4, 1948 (age 78)	Connecticut	25th administrator of the Small Business Administration (2017–2019); Member of the Connecticut State Board of Education (2009–2010); Co-founder of World Wrestling Entertainment; Republican nominee for U.S. senator from Connecticut in 2010 and 2012	

=== Secretary of Veterans Affairs ===
A nomination for Secretary of Veterans Affairs is reviewed during hearings held by the members of the Veterans' Affairs Committee, then presented to the full Senate for a vote. Air Force colonel and former representative Doug Collins from Georgia was announced as Trump's nominee for the position on November 14, 2024. He was confirmed 77–23 by the Senate on February 4, 2025, and sworn in the next day.

Secretary of Veterans Affairs
Portrait	Name	Date of birth	State	Background	Reference
	Doug Collins	August 16, 1966 (age 60)	(Georgia (U.S. state)) Georgia	Ranking Member of the House Judiciary Committee (2019–2020); U.S. representative from GA-9 (2013–2021); Candidate for U.S. senator from Georgia in 2020; Georgia state representative from the 27th district (2007–2013); Colonel in the United States Air Force Reserve (2002–present)	

=== Secretary of Homeland Security ===
A nomination for Secretary of Homeland Security is reviewed during hearings held by the members of the Homeland Security and Governmental Affairs Committee, then presented to the full Senate for a vote.

==== Kristi Noem (2025–2026) ====
Air Force Auxiliary lieutenant colonel and Governor Kristi Noem of South Dakota was announced as Trump's nominee for the position on November 12, 2024. She was confirmed by the Senate 59–34 on January 25, 2025, and sworn in the same day. On March 5, 2026, Trump announced that Noem would be moving on to the newly created position of "Special Envoy for the Shield of the Americas", and Markwayne Mullin, a U.S. Senator from Oklahoma, would be nominated as her replacement. Noem remained as Secretary up until the confirmation and swearing-in of Markwayne Mullin on March 24, 2026.

Secretary of Homeland Security
Portrait	Name	Date of birth	State	Background	Reference
	Kristi Noem	November 30, 1971 (age 54)	South Dakota	33rd governor of South Dakota (2019–2025); U.S. representative from SD-AL (2011–2019); South Dakota state representative from the 6th district (2007–2011); Lieutenant Colonel in the Civil Air Patrol (2008–present)	

==== Markwayne Mullin (2026–present) ====
Markwayne Mullin, a U.S. Senator from Oklahoma, was nominated to replace Kristi Noem as Secretary of Homeland Security on March 5, 2026. He was confirmed by the Senate 54–45 on March 23, 2026, and sworn in the next day.

Secretary of Homeland Security
Portrait	Name	Date of birth	State	Background	Reference
	Markwayne Mullin	July 26, 1977 (age 49)	Oklahoma	U.S. senator from Oklahoma (2023–2026); U.S. representative from OK-2 (2013–2023); Owner of Mullin Plumbing (1997–2021); Inducted into National Wrestling Hall of Fame in 2016; Mixed martial arts (MMA) fighter (2006–2007)	

== Selected candidates for Cabinet-level positions ==
Cabinet-level officials have positions that are considered to be of Cabinet-level, but which are not heads of the executive departments. The exact positions that are considered to be Cabinet-level vary with each administration.

=== Administrator of the Environmental Protection Agency ===
In November 2024, President-elect Trump selected Army lieutenant colonel and former representative Lee Zeldin from New York as EPA administrator. He was confirmed 56–42 by the Senate on January 29, 2025, and sworn in the same day.

- Environment and Public Works Committee is responsible for holding a hearing to advance the nomination for a full Senate vote.

Administrator of the Environmental Protection Agency
Portrait	Name	Date of birth	State	Background	Reference
	Lee Zeldin	January 30, 1980 (age 46)	New York	U.S. representative from NY-01 (2015–2023); Republican Nominee for Governor of New York in 2022; New York state senator from the 3rd district (2011–2014); Lieutenant Colonel in the United States Army (2003–present)	

=== Director of the Office of Management and Budget ===
In November 2024, President-elect Trump selected former Office of Management and Budget director Russell Vought from Virginia as OMB director. He was confirmed 53–47 by the Senate on February 6, 2025, and sworn in the next day.

- Budget Committee is responsible for holding a hearing to advance the nomination for a full Senate vote.

Director of the Office of Management and Budget
Portrait	Name	Date of birth	State	Background	Reference
	Russell Vought	March 26, 1976 (age 50)	Virginia	Policy director of the Republican National Committee (2024–present); Founder and president of the Center for Renewing America (2021–present); 42nd director of the Office of Management and Budget (2019–2021) (Acting: 2019–2020); Deputy director of the Office of Management and Budget (2018–2020); Executive director of the Republican Study Committee (2011–2013)	

=== Director of National Intelligence ===
The director of national intelligence was first elevated to Cabinet-level status by Trump in February 2017, during his first administration. In November 2024, President-elect Trump selected Army lieutenant colonel and former U.S. representative Tulsi Gabbard from Hawaii to serve as his DNI. She was confirmed 52–48 by the Senate on February 12, 2025, and sworn in the same day.

- Intelligence Committee is responsible for holding a hearing to advance the nomination for a full Senate vote.

==== Tulsi Gabbard (2025–2026) ====
Director of National Intelligence
Portrait	Name	Date of birth	State	Background	Reference
	Tulsi Gabbard	April 12, 1981 (age 45)	Hawaii	U.S. representative from HI-02 (2013–2021); Candidate for president of the United States in 2020; Vice Chair of the Democratic National Committee (2013–2016); Member of the Honolulu City Council from the 6th district (2011–2012); Hawaii state representative from the 42nd district (2002–2004); Lieutenant colonel in the United States Army (2003–present)	

==== Jay Clayton (2026–present) ====
Jay Clayton, a U.S. attorney, was being nominated for director of National Intelligence when Tulsi Gabbard's tenure ended on June 19, 2026.

Clayton was confirmed 51–47 by the Senate on July 28, 2026, and sworn in August 3, 2026.

Director of National Intelligence
Portrait	Name	Date of birth	State	Background	Reference
	Jay Clayton	July 11, 1966 (age 60)	New York	United States Attorney for the Southern District of New York (2025–2026); Chair of the Securities and Exchange Commission (2017–2020); Law clerk for Marvin Katz of the United States District Court for the Eastern District of Pennsylvania (1993–1995)	

=== Director of the Central Intelligence Agency ===
The director of the Central Intelligence Agency was first elevated to Cabinet-level status by Trump in February 2017, during his first administration. This ended with the beginning of the Biden administration. In July 2023, the D/CIA was once again elevated to Cabinet-level status by the Biden administration. In November 2024, President-elect Trump selected former DNI and former U.S. representative John Ratcliffe from Texas to serve as CIA director. He was confirmed 74–25 by the Senate on January 23, 2025, and sworn in the same day.

- Intelligence Committee is responsible for holding a hearing to advance the nomination for a full Senate vote.

Director of the Central Intelligence Agency
Portrait	Name	Date of birth	State	Background	Reference
	John Ratcliffe	October 20, 1965 (age 61)	Texas	6th director of national intelligence (2020–2021); U.S. representative for TX-04 (2015–2020); Mayor of Heath, Texas (2004–2012); U.S. attorney for Eastern Texas (2007–2008)	

=== U.S. Trade Representative ===
The U.S. trade representative has been a Cabinet-level member since 1974, the beginning of Gerald Ford's administration. President-elect Trump selected former USTR chief of staff Jamieson Greer from Maryland to be nominated for the position on November 26, 2024. He was confirmed by the Senate 56–43 on February 26, 2025, and sworn in the next day.

- Finance Committee is responsible for holding a hearing to advance the nomination for a full Senate vote.

United States Trade Representative
Portrait	Name	Date of birth	State	Background	Reference
	Jamieson Greer	August 16, 1980 (age 46)	Maryland	Advisory board member of the Vandenberg Coalition (2021–present); Partner in International Trade, King & Spalding (2020–present); Chief of Staff to the U.S. trade representative (2017–2020); Of counsel in international trade & national security, Kirkland & Ellis (2016–2017); Associate in international trade, Skadden, Arps, Slate, Meagher & Flom (2012–2016); Captain in the United States Air Force Judge Advocate General's Corps (2008–2012)	

=== Administrator of the Small Business Administration ===
The administrator of the Small Business Administration has been a Cabinet-level member since 2012, the middle of Barack Obama's administration. It was previously a Cabinet-level member during the Clinton administration. President-elect Trump nominated former U.S. senator Kelly Loeffler from Georgia to be Administrator of the Small Business Administration on December 4, 2024. She was confirmed by the Senate 52–46 on February 19, 2025, and sworn in the next day.

- Small Business and Entrepreneurship Committee is responsible for holding a hearing to advance the nomination for a full Senate vote.

Administrator of the Small Business Administration
Portrait	Name	Date of birth	State	Background	Reference
	Kelly Loeffler	November 27, 1970 (age 55)	Georgia	U.S. senator from Georgia (2020–2021); Chief executive officer of Bakkt (2018–2020)	

=== White House chief of staff ===
==== Susie Wiles (2025–2026) ====
The White House chief of staff has traditionally been the highest-ranking staff employee of the White House. The responsibilities of the chief of staff are both managerial and advisory over the president's official business. The chief of staff is appointed by and serves at the pleasure of the president; it does not require Senate confirmation. On November 7, 2024, Trump announced Susie Wiles from Florida as his choice for his chief of staff, having served as his 2024 campaign co-chair. Wiles is the first woman to hold the position. On November 6, 2026, Trump announced that Wiles would step down on November 6 and be replaced by deputy chief of staff Stephen Miller.

White House Chief of Staff
Portrait	Name	Date of birth	State	Years	Background	Reference
	Susie Wiles	May 14, 1957 (age 69)	Florida	January 20, 2025 – November 6, 2026	Co-chair of Donald Trump's 2024 presidential campaign; Senior Advisor for Ron DeSantis's 2018 gubernatorial campaign; Co-chair of Donald Trump's 2016 presidential campaign in Florida; Campaign manager of Jon Huntsman Jr.'s 2012 presidential campaign; Campaign manager of Rick Scott's 2010 gubernatorial campaign; Chief of Staff to Jacksonville Mayor John Delaney	

==== Stephen Miller (2026–) ====
White House Chief of Staff
Portrait	Name	Date of birth	State	Years	Background	Reference
	Stephen Miller	August 23, 1985 (age 41)	California	November 9, 2026 – present	White House Deputy Chief of Staff for Policy (2025-2026); United States Homeland Security Advisor (2025-2026); Senior Advisor to the President of the United States (2017-2021)	

== Acting Cabinet officials ==
Because cabinet members must be confirmed by the Senate, acting officials are typically appointed for the period before the Senate votes, in accordance with the Federal Vacancies Reform Act of 1998. For cabinet positions, only people who already actively hold a position confirmed by the Senate at the end of the previous administration are eligible, and they retain that position while they are detailed to the acting position. Normally, a senior employee of the same executive agency who is equivalent to a GS-15 or above on the federal pay scale would also be eligible, but this is believed to be unconstitutional in the case of secretaries of the federal executive departments, although this has not been tested in court.

Acting position	Appointee	Permanent position	Days in acting position
Secretary of State	Lisa D. Kenna	Principal Deputy Assistant Secretary for the Bureau of Intelligence and Research	1
Secretary of the Treasury	David Lebryk	Fiscal Assistant Secretary of the Treasury	8
Secretary of Defense	Robert G. Salesses	Deputy Director for Washington Headquarters Services	5
Attorney General	James McHenry	Chief Administrative Hearing Officer	16
Secretary of the Interior	Walter Cruickshank	Deputy Director of the Bureau of Ocean Energy Management	12
Secretary of Agriculture	Gary Washington	Chief Information Officer	24
Secretary of Commerce	Jeremy Pelter	Deputy Assistant Secretary for Administration	32
Secretary of Labor	Vince Micone	Deputy Assistant Secretary for Operations	50
Secretary of Health and Human Services	Dorothy Fink	Director of the Office on Women's Health	24
Secretary of Housing and Urban Development	Matt Ammon	Director of the Office of Lead Hazard Control and Healthy Homes	16
Secretary of Transportation	Judith Kaleta	Deputy General Counsel	8
Secretary of Energy	Ingrid Kolb	Director of the Office of Management	14
Secretary of Education	Denise Carter	Principal Deputy Chief Operating Officer for Student Aid	42
Secretary of Veterans Affairs	Todd B. Hunter	Deputy Executive Director of Office of Mission Support	16
Secretary of Homeland Security	Benjamine Huffman	Director of Federal Law Enforcement Training Centers	5
Administrator of the Environmental Protection Agency	James Payne	Deputy General Counsel	9
Director of the Office of Management and Budget	Matthew Vaeth	Assistant Director for Legislative Reference	18
Director of National Intelligence	Stacey Dixon	Principal Deputy Director	5
Director of National Intelligence	Lora Shiao	Chief Operating Officer	18
Director of the Central Intelligence Agency	Thomas Sylvester Jr.	Deputy Director for Operations	3
Trade Representative	Juan Millán	Deputy General Counsel for Monitoring and Enforcement	38
Administrator of the Small Business Administration	Everett Woodel	District Director for Central and Southern Ohio	31

== See also ==
- First cabinet of Donald Trump
- Political appointments of the second Trump administration
- Second inauguration of Donald Trump – 60th United States presidential inauguration
- Second presidential transition of Donald Trump – Transfer of presidential power from Joe Biden to Donald Trump
