= Cabinet of Donald Trump =

Cabinet of Donald Trump may refer to:

- First cabinet of Donald Trump (2017–2021)
- Second cabinet of Donald Trump (2025–present)
