= Nature Is Nonpartisan =

- Formation: 2025
- Founder: Benji Backer
- Type: Nonprofit organization
- Tax ID no.: 99-2462539
- Legal status: 501(c)(3)
- Purpose: Nonpartisan environmental advocacy
- Headquarters: United States
- Region served: United States
- Key people: Benji Backer (Founder and CEO)
- Website: natureisnonpartisan.org

Nature Is Nonpartisan is an American environmental advocacy nonprofit organization founded in 2025 with the stated goal of depoliticizing environmental conservation.

== History ==
Nature Is Nonpartisan was launched in 2025 by environmental advocate and author Benji Backer, who serves as its chief executive officer. Backer states he was motivated to start the organization to address the partisan nature of environmental politics in the United States in order to pursue effective conservation solutions and policies.

== Goals and agenda ==
Nature Is Nonpartisan seeks to "revive America's nonpartisan environmental legacy" by building a movement that appeals to American citizens regardless of political affiliation. The organization's staff is intentionally structured to include perspectives from across the political spectrum citing that nature and environmental stewardship are common interests to all within the United States.

Core objectives include coordinating public advocacy to help citizens engage elected officials on environmental issues, building broad support for environmental action among diverse demographic and political groups nationwide and connecting individuals to active conservation groups.

== Activities and policy focus ==
Nature Is Nonpartisan primarily focuses on grassroots advocacy through public outreach, participating in conservation policy forums and general coalition-building to promote nonpartisan support for environmental issues. The 2025 action plan prioritized forest restoration and wildfire prevention, improving water quality and infrastructure, enhancing coastal disaster resilience, and bolstering land stewardship in the United States.

== Organizational structure ==
The organization is registered as a 501(c)(3) nonprofit headquartered in the United States.

== Public reception and influence ==
News coverage has discussed Nature Is Nonpartisan as part of broader discussions on environmental advocacy outside traditional partisan frameworks. It has been described as seeking to reframe environmental issues as shared values rather than politically divisive topics.

== See also ==
- Nonpartisan organizations in the United States
- Environmental history of the United States
- Biodiversity
- Sustainability
