= Liberty Energy =

American oilfield services company

- Traded as: NYSE: LBRT
- Headquarters: Denver, Colorado, U.S.
- Key people: Chris Wright (Founder); Ron Gusek (CEO)
- Revenue: ▼US$4.01 billion (2025)
- Operating income: ▼US$72.7 million (2025)
- Net income: ▼US$148 million (2025)
- Website: libertyenergy.com

Liberty Energy Inc. is an American onshore oilfield services company based in Denver, Colorado. Liberty Energy was founded by Chris Wright in 2011, who later became 17th United States secretary of energy. Under Wright's leadership, the company participated in the United States fracking boom of the 2010s.

== History ==
In 2020, Schlumberger sold their fracking division to Liberty Energy. In 2023, Liberty Energy bought Siren Energy for $78 million.

In 2023, the company paid for a media campaign against The North Face criticizing their environmental positions, while creating products made of petroleum-based plastics.

In 2024, the company settled a blatant racial discrimination case with the Equal Employment Opportunity Commission for long-term toleration of racial slurs at a Texas oil field.

During the Biden administration, Liberty Energy sued the federal government over rules related to Environmental, social, and governance reporting and the United States Securities and Exchange Commission's requirements for reporting climate risk.
