= David Huizenga =

American civil servant

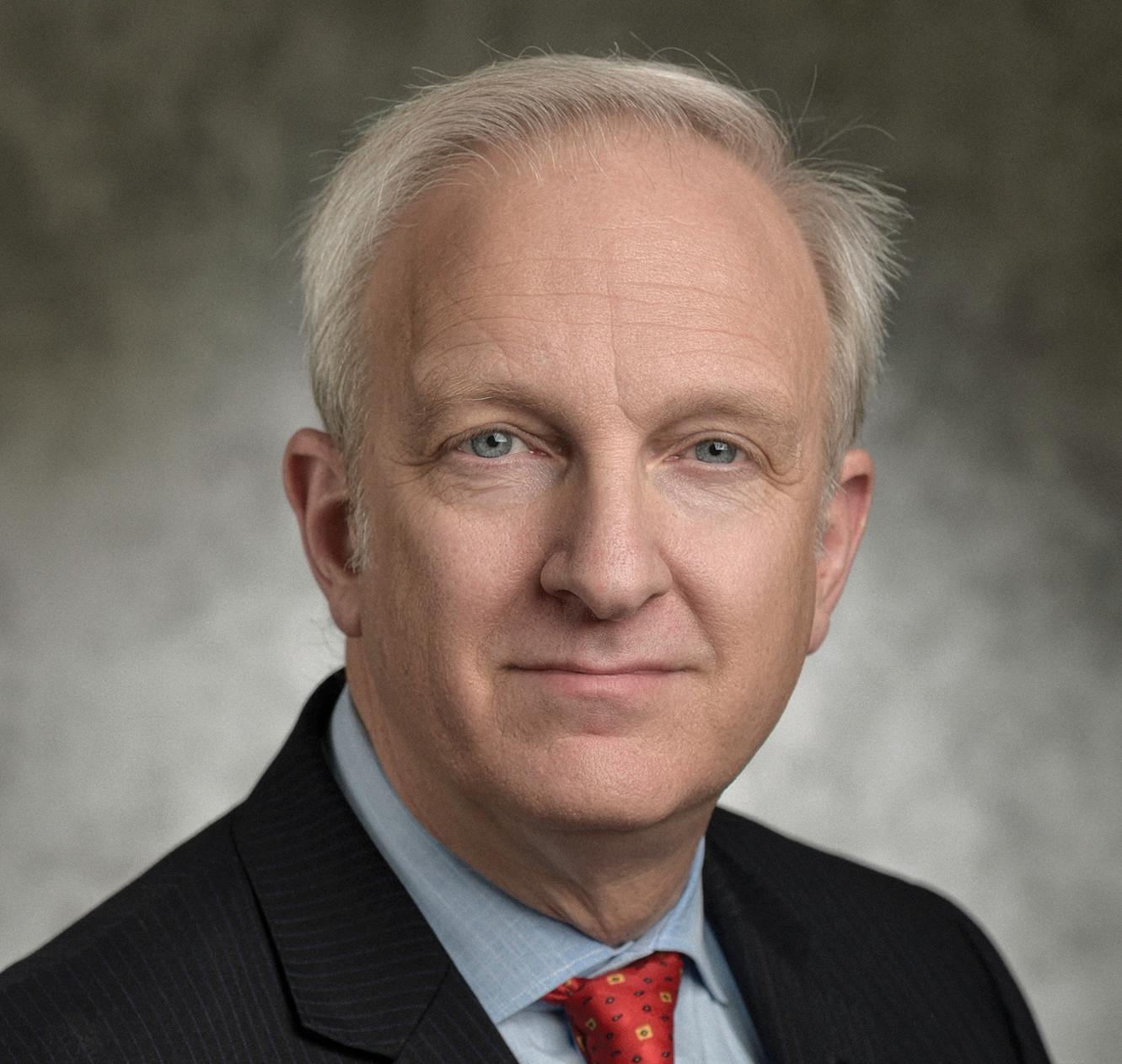

Acting United States Secretary of Energy
- In office January 20, 2021 – February 25, 2021
- President: Joe Biden
- Preceded by: Dan Brouillette
- Succeeded by: Jennifer Granholm

Personal details
- Education: Montana State University (BS, MS)

David G. Huizenga is an American civil servant who serves as the associate principal deputy administrator of the National Nuclear Security Administration, and was the acting United States secretary of energy.

== Education ==
Huizenga attended Montana State University, graduating with a bachelor's degree in chemistry, followed by a master's degree in chemical engineering.

== Acting Secretary of Energy ==
On January 20, 2021 following the inauguration of President Joe Biden, Huizenga was selected to act as acting United States Secretary of Energy, pending the confirmation of nominee Jennifer Granholm by the United States Senate.

Political offices
Preceded by Dan Brouillette	United States Secretary of Energy; Acting; 2021	Succeeded by Jennifer Granholm
