= Ingrid Kolb =

American government official

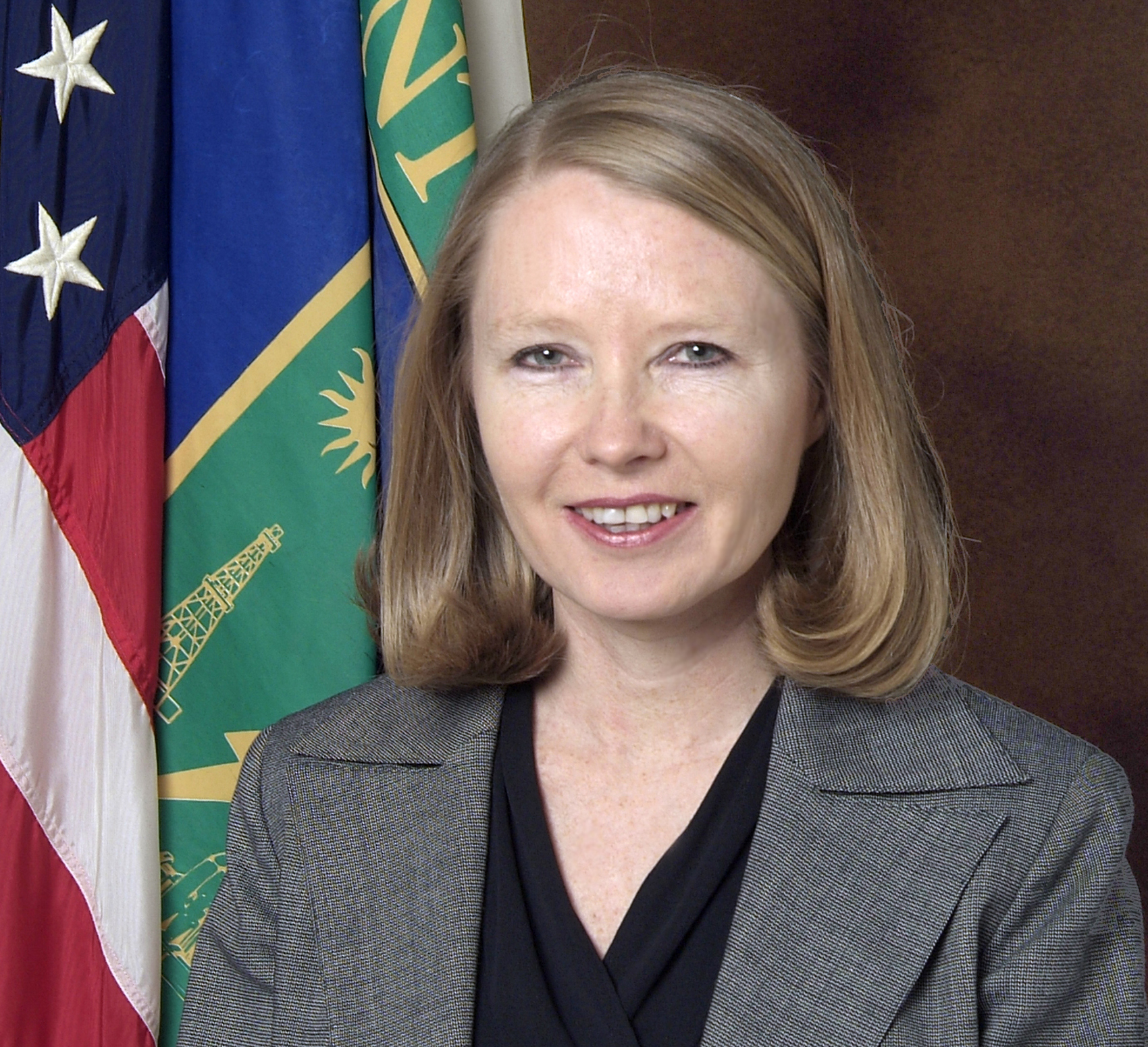
- Official portrait, 2017

Acting United States Secretary of Energy
- In office January 20, 2025 – February 4, 2025
- President: Donald Trump
- Preceded by: Jennifer Granholm
- Succeeded by: Chris Wright

Personal details
- Education: Sweet Briar College (BA)

Ingrid Ann Christner Kolb is an American government official serving as Director of the United States Department of Energy Office of Management. She served as Acting Secretary of Energy from January 20 to February 4, 2025.

Political offices
Preceded by Jennifer Granholm	United States Secretary of Energy; Acting; 2025	Succeeded by Chris Wright
