= American Conservation Coalition =

Nonprofit environmental advocacy organization

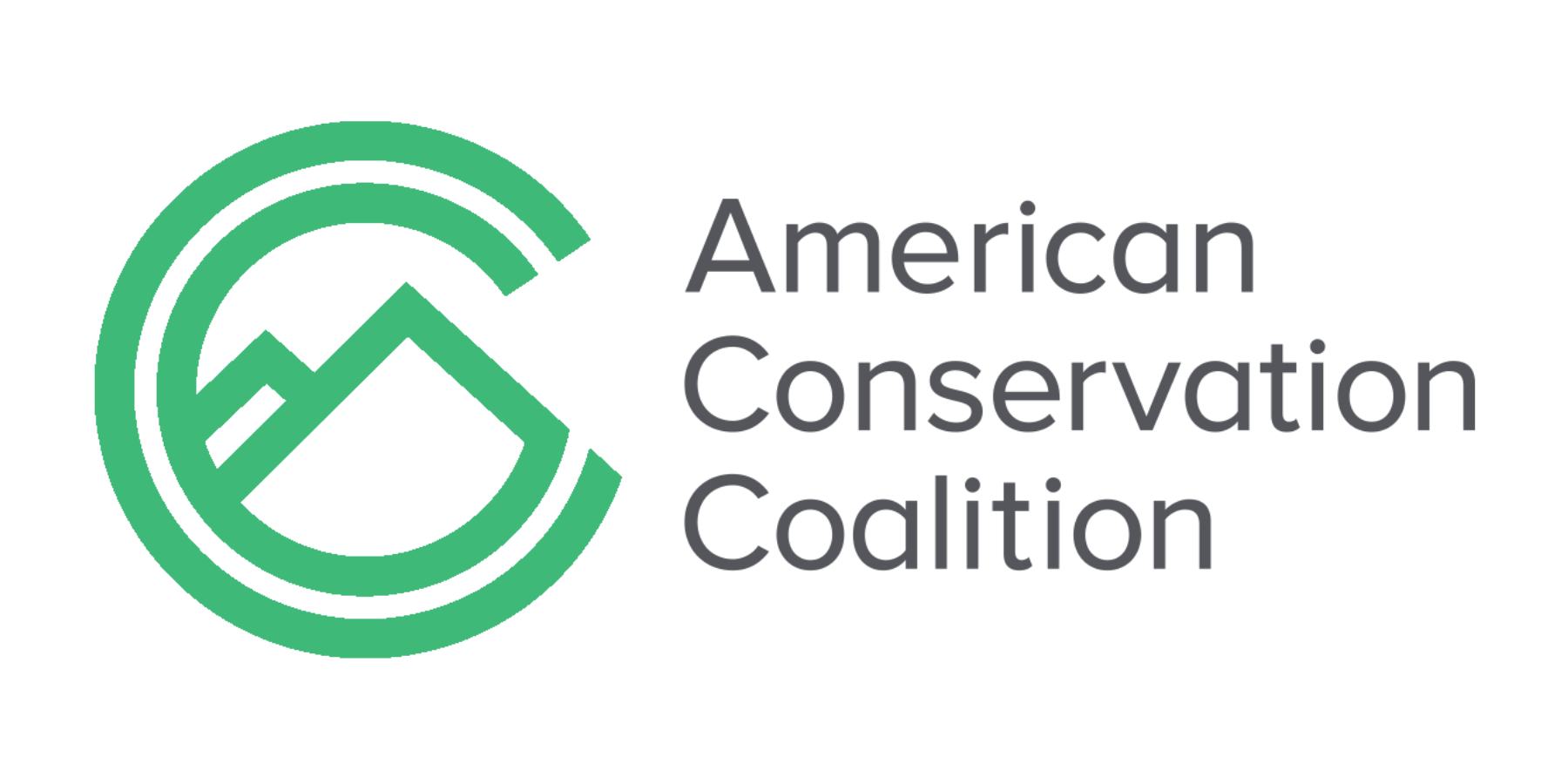
- Established: July 26, 2017; 9 years ago
- Type: Nonprofit
- Headquarters: Washington, D.C., US
- Region served: United States
- Key people: Benji Backer (Founder) Danielle Franz (CEO) Christopher Barnard (President) Stephen Perkins (COO)
- Website: acc.eco

The American Conservation Coalition (ACC) is a 501(c)(3) environmental conservative nonprofit founded in 2017.

== History ==
ACC was founded in Appleton, Wisconsin, in 2017 by a group of young conservatives with the goal of adding conservative voices to environmental conversations.

ACC's founder was Benji Backer, who stepped down as president of the organization, transitioning into a chairmanship role in 2023. Danielle Franz is the current CEO of the ACC. Other key figures include Chris Barnard as president and Stephen Perkins as COO.

In 2021, ACC had 5,000 members. ACC claimed to have 60,000 members in 2024 and 100,000 members in 2025.

ACC maintains links with senior members of the second Trump administration such as Secretary of Energy Chris Wright, Secretary of the Interior Doug Burgum and Administrator of the EPA Lee Zeldin. In 2024, it sponsored the Republican National Convention. It also hosted climate town halls with candidates in the 2024 Republican Party presidential primaries.

ACC has a political action committee, known as ACC Action.

== Activities and positions ==
ACC supports environmental policies based on conservative principles. ACC advocates for conservation and free-market environmental policies. ACC supports the development and deployment of nuclear energy, renewable energy, biomass, geothermal energy, and hydroelectric power. It also supports the use of natural gas as a relatively low-carbon fuel during a transition phase away from higher-carbon sources. In 2022, ACC released The Climate Commitment. ACC supports the building of data centers on brownfield and Superfund sites in exchange for involved companies cleaning and redeveloping the land.
