= United States Secretary of Energy =

Head of the US Department of Energy

- Seal of the Department of Energy

- Flag of the secretary

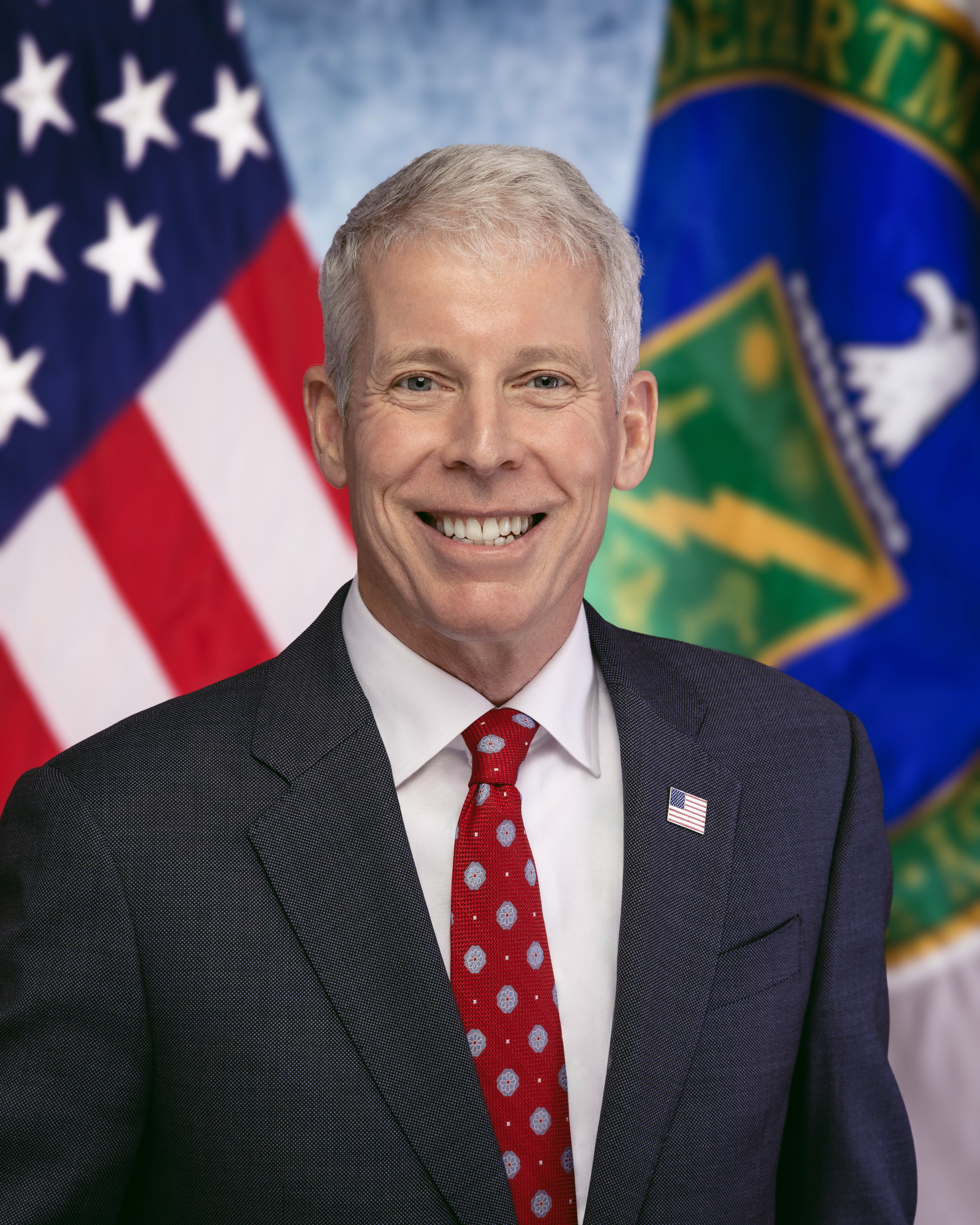
- Incumbent; Chris Wright since February 3, 2025
- United States Department of Energy
- Style: Mr. Secretary (informal); The Honorable (formal)
- Member of: Cabinet of the United States; United States National Security Council
- Reports to: President of the United States
- Seat: James V. Forrestal Building, Washington, D.C.
- Appointer: The president; with advice and consent of the Senate
- Term length: No fixed term
- Constituting instrument: 42 U.S.C. § 7131
- Formation: August 6, 1977
- First holder: James R. Schlesinger
- Succession: Fifteenth
- Deputy: Deputy Secretary
- Salary: Executive Schedule, Level I
- Website: Energy.gov

The United States secretary of energy is the head of the United States Department of Energy, a member of the Cabinet of the United States and fifteenth in the presidential line of succession. The position was created on October 1, 1977, when President Jimmy Carter signed the Department of Energy Organization Act, establishing the department. Originally, the secretary and the department focused on energy production and regulation. Over time, the emphasis shifted to developing technology for more efficient energy sources and energy education. After the Cold War, the department's attention also turned to radioactive waste disposal and environmental quality maintenance.

Former secretary of defense James Schlesinger was the first secretary of energy. As a Republican nominated by Democratic president Jimmy Carter, Schlesinger’s appointment remains the only instance of a president choosing a member of another political party for the position. Schlesinger is also the only secretary to be dismissed from the post. Hazel O'Leary, Bill Clinton’s first secretary of energy, was the first female and first African American to hold the position. The first Hispanic to serve as energy secretary was Clinton’s second energy secretary, Federico Peña. Spencer Abraham became the first Arab American to hold the position on January 20, 2001, under President George W. Bush. Steven Chu, appointed on January 20, 2009, under President Barack Obama, became the first Asian American to hold the position. Chu also served as the longest-serving secretary of energy and was the first individual to join the Cabinet after having received a Nobel Prize. Former Michigan governor, Jennifer Granholm, confirmed on February 25, 2021 under President Joe Biden, was the second woman to lead the Department of Energy. Chris Wright is the current secretary of energy under the Trump administration, confirmed on February, 3, 2025.

== Nuclear weapons ==
In addition to responsibilities related to generation and use of energy, the secretary is the most senior official other than the president of the United States or secretary of defense with primary responsibility for the nation's approximately 3,800 viable nuclear weapons. This arrangement is intended to maintain full civilian control over strategic weapons, except as directed by the president for specific military uses. The department of energy is responsible for the building, maintenance, and disposal of all nuclear weapons within the United States' arsenal in addition to safeguarding these weapons when they are not actively deployed in military service. Under the terms of several successive treaties, most recently New START, the United States has reduced its strategic arsenal to 1,500 deployed weapons. Consequently, many older legacy weapons systems have been dismantled or scheduled for dismantlement, with their core radioactive fuel - generally plutonium - being reprocessed into reactor-grade or space exploration fuel.

== List of secretaries of energy ==
Parties

Democratic (7) Republican (11)

Status

Acting secretary of energy

No.	Portrait	Name	State of residence	Took office	Left office	Party	President(s)
1		James Schlesinger	Virginia	August 6, 1977	August 23, 1979	Republican	Jimmy Carter (1977–1981)
2		Charles Duncan	Texas	August 24, 1979	January 20, 1981	Democratic	Jimmy Carter (1977–1981)
3		James Edwards	South Carolina	January 23, 1981	November 5, 1982	Republican	Ronald Reagan (1981–1989)
4		Donald Hodel	Oregon	November 5, 1982	February 7, 1985	Republican	Ronald Reagan (1981–1989)
5		John Herrington	California	February 7, 1985	January 20, 1989	Republican	Ronald Reagan (1981–1989)
6		James Watkins	California	March 1, 1989	January 20, 1993	Republican	George H. W. Bush (1989–1993)
7		Hazel O'Leary	Virginia	January 22, 1993	January 20, 1997	Democratic	Bill Clinton (1993–2001)
–		Charles B. Curtis	Pennsylvania	January 20, 1997	March 12, 1997	Democratic	Bill Clinton (1993–2001)
8		Federico Peña	Colorado	March 12, 1997	June 30, 1998	Democratic	Bill Clinton (1993–2001)
9		Bill Richardson	New Mexico	August 18, 1998	January 20, 2001	Democratic	Bill Clinton (1993–2001)
10		Spencer Abraham	Michigan	January 20, 2001	February 1, 2005	Republican	George W. Bush (2001–2009)
11		Samuel Bodman	Illinois	February 1, 2005	January 20, 2009	Republican	George W. Bush (2001–2009)
12		Steven Chu	California	January 20, 2009	April 22, 2013	Democratic	Barack Obama (2009–2017)
–		Daniel Poneman	Ohio	April 22, 2013	May 21, 2013	Democratic	Barack Obama (2009–2017)
13		Ernest Moniz	Massachusetts	May 21, 2013	January 20, 2017	Democratic	Barack Obama (2009–2017)
–		Grace Bochenek		January 20, 2017	March 2, 2017		Donald Trump (2017–2021)
14		Rick Perry	Texas	March 2, 2017	December 1, 2019	Republican	Donald Trump (2017–2021)
15		Dan Brouillette	Texas	December 1, 2019	December 4, 2019	Republican	Donald Trump (2017–2021)
15		Dan Brouillette	Texas	December 4, 2019	January 20, 2021	Republican	Donald Trump (2017–2021)
–		David Huizenga		January 20, 2021	February 25, 2021	Democratic	Joe Biden (2021–2025)
16	Secretary Jennifer Granholm	Jennifer Granholm	Michigan	February 25, 2021	January 20, 2025	Democratic	Joe Biden (2021–2025)
–		Ingrid Kolb	Virginia	January 20, 2025	February 4, 2025	Republican	Donald Trump (2025–present)
17		Chris Wright	Colorado	February 3, 2025	present	Republican	Donald Trump (2025–present)

== See also ==
- United States Secretary of Transportation
- White House Office of Energy and Climate Change Policy

U.S. order of precedence (ceremonial)
Preceded by Sean Duffy as Secretary of Transportation	Order of precedence of the United States as Secretary of Energy	Succeeded by Linda McMahon as Secretary of Education
U.S. presidential line of succession
Preceded by Secretary of Transportation; Sean Duffy	15th in line	Succeeded by Secretary of Education; Linda McMahon
