= Chris Wright =

American businessman (born 1965)

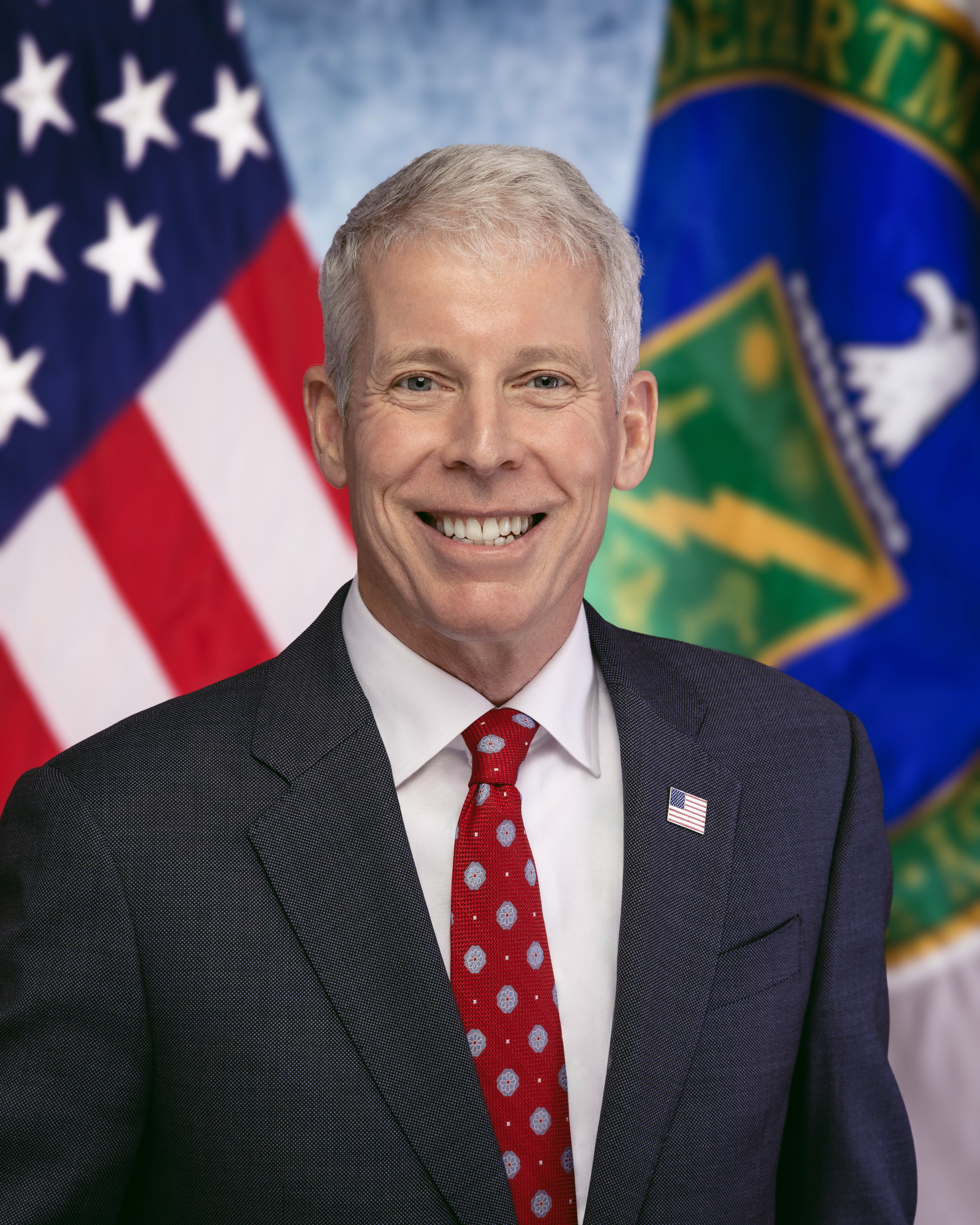
- Official portrait, 2025

17th United States Secretary of Energy
- Incumbent
- Assumed office February 4, 2025
- President: Donald Trump
- Deputy: James Danly
- Preceded by: Jennifer Granholm

Personal details
- Born: Christopher Allen Wright; January 15, 1965 (age 61) New Jersey, U.S.
- Party: Libertarian Party (c. 2016)
- Spouse: Liz Wright
- Children: 2
- Education: Massachusetts Institute of Technology (BS); University of California, Berkeley (attended)
- Wright's voice Wright's opening statement in his Senate confirmation hearing. Recorded January 15, 2025

Christopher Allen Wright (born January 15, 1965) is an American businessman who has served as the United States secretary of energy since 2025.

Wright graduated from the Massachusetts Institute of Technology with a degree in mechanical engineering in 1985. In 1992, he co-founded Pinnacle Technologies, a shale gas extraction firm. Wright sold the company to Halliburton in 2006. He founded Liberty Resources in 2010 and Liberty Energy in 2011.

In November 2024, then-President-elect Donald Trump named Wright as his nominee to serve as the secretary of energy. Wright was confirmed by the Senate in February 2025.

== Early life and education (1965–1992) ==
Christopher Allen Wright was born on January 15, 1965, in New Jersey. Wright was the youngest of four children. His father worked in the investment industry, while his mother was a homemaker. Wright was raised in Denver and graduated from Cherry Creek High School.

Wright graduated from the Massachusetts Institute of Technology (MIT) with a degree in mechanical engineering in 1985. He later testified that he enrolled to work on nuclear fusion energy. Wright's undergraduate thesis concerned the applicability of semi-viscous materials to dampen vibrations in spacecraft. At MIT, Wright interned at Honeywell. After graduation, Wright enrolled for one semester at the University of California, Berkeley. The university later confirmed that Wright was employed as a teaching assistant in its electrical engineering and computer science department. In February 1986, Wright returned to MIT, but withdrew from the university in January 1988.

== Career ==
=== Early work and Pinnacle Technologies (1985–2006) ===
After ending his graduate work at the University of California, Berkeley, Wright worked for Hunter Geophysics, a fracking firm. According to Wright, a former student at Cherry Creek High School, Liz, told him about the firm; Wright later married Liz, with whom he has two children. Wright later told the Denver Business Journal that he led the team that created the tiltmeter software FracPro. In 1992, Wright co-founded Pinnacle Technologies, a shale gas extraction firm, with Bruce Braden, the chief financial officer of Hunter Geophysics. Wright sold the company to Halliburton in 2006.

=== Liberty Resources and Liberty Energy (2010–2025) ===
Wright speaking at the American Conservation Coalition in June 2023

In 2010, Wright founded Liberty Resources, an exploration and drilling company. The following year, he established Liberty Oilfield Services, which changed its name to Liberty Energy in 2022. At Liberty, Wright was an outspoken promoter of fossil fuels, appearing at rallies and on podcasts. In 2019, Wright filmed himself and other employees drinking fracking fluid. He published a 180-page report criticizing what he perceived as a "myopic focus on climate change" in 2021.

Wright resigned from Liberty Energy in February 2025. He was set to receive a payment from the company the following month, after he had become the secretary of energy.

=== Board memberships and assets ===
Wright became the chairman of Stroud Energy, a company he co-founded with Braden, in 2000. Wright sold the company to Range Resources for US$450 million in 2006. Wright served the board of EMX Royalty, a mining royalties company, and the Urban Solutions Group, an oil and gas company. In July 2024, he joined the board of Oklo, a nuclear power company. Wright served as a director of the Domestic Energy Producers Alliance, a lobbying organization founded by the oil tycoon Harold Hamm, and the Western Energy Alliance. Wright resigned from his board positions in February 2025. He served on the board of the Federal Reserve Bank of Kansas City until June 2024.

In 2023, Wright established a charity, the Bettering Human Lives Foundation, to provide liquefied natural gas for cooking in Kenya and other African countries. According to the Colorado Department of State, the foundation began with US$11,450 in assets and spent all of it on administrative costs.

=== Political activities ===
By June 2017, Wright had become involved in the Koch network. He is a frequent Republican donor. Wright and his wife, Liz, donated US$175,000 each to Trump's joint fund-raising campaign committee, Trump 47, in 2024.

== Secretary of Energy (2025–present) ==
=== Nomination and confirmation ===
Wright testifying before the Senate Committee on Energy and Natural Resources in January 2025.

In April 2024, Wright met with Donald Trump at Mar-a-Lago and presented his views on climate change. Trump stated that he was considering nominating Wright to serve as the secretary of energy if he won the 2024 presidential election. Wright became an advisor to Trump on energy issues. After Trump's victory, Harold Hamm encouraged Trump to nominate Wright as the secretary of energy. Thomas Pyle, the president of the American Energy Alliance, later publicly endorsed Wright. On November 16, 2024, Trump named Wright as his nominee to serve in the position and appointed him to a Council of National Energy.

Wright appeared before the Senate Committee on Energy and Natural Resources on January 15, 2025. He was questioned on his past comments praising fossil fuels, downplaying global warming, and criticizing renewable energy. Wright stated that he would support all forms of energy, including oil, gas, and coal, and that he would work to address climate change. The committee voted to advance Wright's nomination in a 15–5 vote on January 23. The Senate voted to confirm Wright in a 59–38 vote on February 3.

=== Initial tenure ===
Wright was sworn in on February 4, 2025. He hired several fossil fuel officials to the Department of Energy, including Andrew Rapp, a consultant for oil and gas companies. In his first order, Wright directed the agency to review its appliance standards program. Wright's tenure occurred as three staffers working for the Department of Government Efficiency had been detailed to the Department of Energy. According to CNN, Wright gave a representative from the initiative, Luke Farritor, access to the Department of Energy's IT systems, overruling the agency's general counsel. Amid concerns that the staffers had access to nuclear secrets, Wright denied that they were able to view "proprietary information." After Elon Musk sent a memorandum asking federal employees for work information, Wright told workers not to respond to the email. That month, Wright fired over three hundred probationary employees at the National Nuclear Security Administration. After speaking with members of Congress, most firings were reverted.

In October 2025, Wright directed the Federal Energy Regulatory Commission (FERC) to a "file joint, co-located load and generation interconnection requests". That month, he cancelled 321 clean energy grants in states that voted for Kamala Harris, totaling $7.56 billion. Wright stated in a June 2026 congressional hearing that the cancellations were not politically motivated. Administration officials stated in a July 2026 court filing that the cancellations were not "based on any programmatic, statutory, cost-reduction or performance-based factor" and were "based solely on the political identity" of the grant recipient's state.

=== Foreign talks ===
Wright with Delcy Rodríguez, the acting president of Venezuela, in September 2026

In January 2026, after the United States captured Venezuelan president Nicolás Maduro and his wife, Cilia Flores, Wright and Secretary of the Interior Doug Burgum moved to discuss extracting oil reserves in the country. Wright told Fox Business that he had been receiving calls from various executives with interest in doing business with Venezuela. The following month, Wright arrived in the country to encourage Venezuela to open its economy for foreign access. That month, Wright warned that the United States would leave the International Energy Agency if it continued to promote a net-zero scenario to eliminate fossil fuel emissions by 2050.

On March 10, 2026, Wright incorrectly claimed, in a social media post, that the US Navy had escorted an oil tanker through the Strait of Hormuz. Oil prices fell below $80 a barrel on the announcement. The post was later deleted, and prices rose again.

During his tenure as Secretary of Energy, Wright has forced several coal plants to stay operational, arguing they were needed for grid reliability despite regional grid operators permitting them to close. A court struck down Wright's use of emergency powers in non-emergency situations in September 2026. The plan was proposed by coal industry lobbyists.

In July 2026, Wright signed an agreement with Abdulaziz bin Salman Al Saud, Saudi Arabia's minister of energy, allowing Saudi Arabia to enrich nuclear fuel without inspection requirements.

== Views ==
In June 2017, Wright told Politico that he voted for Gary Johnson in the 2016 presidential election. He described Donald Trump as misaligned with his ideology, praising Speaker of the House Paul Ryan instead.

=== Energy sources ===
In January 2023, Wright posted a video to LinkedIn in which he rejected the existence of a climate crisis and an energy transition. LinkedIn removed the video for violating its policies on misinformation. Wright appealed the decision and the video was reinstated the following day. He later told The Wall Street Journal that, while he did not deny the existence of climate change, he stated that the climate is only slightly warming and that weather changes were not responsible for more intense natural disasters. Wright has attributed his views on climate change to the Danish author Bjørn Lomborg.

Wright has argued that fossil fuels are a moral necessity, citing energy poverty in developing countries. He has specifically noted energy poverty's consequences for cooking. After The North Face declined to sell company-branded jackets to an oil and gas company, Wright engaged in a marketing campaign accusing The North Face of hypocrisy, noting that its jackets were manufactured with fossil fuels.

Wright has described renewable energy sources, such as wind and solar power as "unreliable and costly". In February 2025, he criticized the United Kingdom's net-zero emissions target as a "sinister goal". At The New York Times's Climate Forward event in September, Wright encouraged other countries to withdraw from the Paris Agreement. That month, Wright claimed that solar panels could not sufficiently provide enough energy for the world, even if its surface was entirely covered by them.

Wright is critical of European climate regulations. In September 2025, he stated that European countries, including Hungary and Slovakia, should cease buying liquefied natural gas from Russia, arguing that it supports Russia's war in Ukraine.

=== Technology and resource issues ===
Wright has compared the development of artificial intelligence to the Manhattan Project. He has supported AI data centers, arguing that they support the economy and bolster national security.

Political offices
Preceded by Jennifer Granholm	United States Secretary of Energy; 2025–present	Incumbent
Order of precedence
Preceded by Sean Duffy as United States Secretary of Transportation	Order of precedence of the United States as Secretary of Energy	Succeeded by Linda McMahon as United States Secretary of Education
U.S. presidential line of succession
Preceded by Sean Duffy as United States Secretary of Transportation	Fifteenth in line as Secretary of Energy	Succeeded by Linda McMahon as United States Secretary of Education
