= GemStone/S =

GemStone/S Object Server
- GemStone/S logo and wordmark
- Paradigms: Object database, object-oriented, Distributed cache and computing, in-memory database and processing
- Developer: GemTalk Systems
- First appeared: 1986; 40 years ago
- Stable release: 64 Bit 3.7.1
- Typing discipline: Dynamic
- Implementation language: Smalltalk
- Platform: IA-32, x86-64
- OS: Cross-platform: AIX, Linux, macOS, Solaris
- License: Proprietary commercial software
- Website: gemtalksystems.com/products/gss32

Influenced by
- Smalltalk

Influenced
- Java EE, GemFire

GemStone/S is computer software, an application framework that was first available for the programming language Smalltalk as an object database. It is proprietary commercial software.

== Company history ==
GemStone Systems was founded on March 1, 1982, as Servio Logic, to build a database machine based on a set theory model. Ian Huang instigated the founding, as the technology adviser to the CEO of Sampoerna Holdings (Putera Sampoerna), by recruiting the following team, consisting of:

- Frank Bouton - President, who was the cofounder of Floating Point Systems Inc
- Dr. Michael Mulder - Vice President of Engineering, who was the Group Manager for Advanced Processor Design at Sperry Univac and Principal Architect for the Univac 1180 mainframe
- Steve Ivy - Vice President of Operation, who was a senior manager at Tektronix
- Leonard Yuen - Vice President, Business Development, who was the Development Manager for the IBM DB2 database
- Dr. George Copeland - Chief Architect, who was the Senior Staff Engineer at the Advanced Development Group in Tektronix
- Steve Redfield - Chief Engineer, who was the Chief Engineer for the Intel 80286 microprocessor
- Alan Purdy - who was a Staff Engineer at Tektronix
- Bob Bretl - who was a software engineering manager at Tektronix Signal Processing Systems
- Allen Otis - who was also with Tektronix
- John Telford - who was a software engineering manager from Electro Scientific Industries
- Monty Williams

Servio Logic was renamed GemStone Systems, Inc. in June 1995. The firm developed its first hardware prototype in 1982, and shipped its first software product (GemStone 1.0) in 1986. The engineering group resides in Beaverton, Oregon. Three of the original cofounding engineers, Bob Bretl, Allen Otis, and Monty Williams (now retired), have been with the firm since its start.

GemStone's owners pioneered implementing distributed computing in business systems. Many information system features now associated with Java EE were implemented earlier in GemStone. GemStone and VisualWave were an early web application server platform. (VisualWave and VisualWorks are now owned by Cincom.) GemStone played an important sponsorship role in the Smalltalk Industry Council at the time when IBM was backing VisualAge Smalltalk. As of 2005, Instantiations acquired the world-wide rights to the IBM VisualAge Smalltalk product and has rebranded it as the VAST (VA Smalltalk) Platform.

After a major transition, GemStone for Smalltalk continued as GemStone/S and various C++ and Java products for scalable, multitier architecture distributed computing systems evolved into the GemStone/J product. This in turn gave rise to GemFire, an early example of a Data Fabric for complex event processing (CEP), event stream processing (ESP), data virtualization, and distributed caching.

On May 6, 2010, SpringSource, a division of VMware, announced it had entered into a definitive agreement to acquire GemStone.

On May 2, 2013, GemTalk Systems acquired the GemStone/S platform from Pivotal Software (the EMC and VMware spin-off).

Gemfire remained with Pivotal's Big Data division. The product is available standalone but is also integrated into its Cloud Foundry PaaS as Pivotal Cloud Cache.

== Product ==
GemStone builds on the programming language Smalltalk. GemStone systems serve as mission-critical applications. GemStone frameworks still see some interest for web services and service-oriented architectures.

GemStone is an advanced Smalltalk platform for developing, deploying, and managing scalable, high-performance, multi-tier applications based on business objects.

A recent revival of interest in Smalltalk has occurred as a result of its use to generate JavaScript for e-commerce web pages or in web application frameworks such as the Seaside web framework. Systems based on object databases are not as common as those based on ORM or object–relational mapping frameworks such as TopLink or Hibernate. In the application framework market, JBoss and BEA Weblogic are somewhat analogous to GemStone.

GemTalk Systems, the creator of GemStone, also has a series of products under the GemBuilder moniker, which provide an interface between Smalltalk or Java clients and GemStone databases. Versions of this product exist for VisualWorks Smalltalk, VA Smalltalk (VAST Platform), and Java environments.

== See also ==
- SpringSource
