= Ted Kaehler =

American computer scientist (born 1950)

- Born: Edwin B. Kaehler; 1950 (age 75–76); Palo Alto, California, United States
- Education: Stanford University (B.S., 1972); Carnegie Mellon University (MSc, 1976)
- Known for: Work on Smalltalk, Squeak, HyperCard
- Scientific career
- Fields: Computer science
- Workplaces: Xerox PARC, Apple Computer, Walt Disney Imagineering, Hewlett-Packard, Viewpoints Research Institute
- Academic advisors: Donald Knuth
- Website: tedkaehler.weather-dimensions.com/us/ted

Ted Kaehler (born 1950) is an American computer scientist known for his role in the development of several system methods. He is most noted for his contributions to the programming languages Smalltalk, Squeak, and Apple Computer's HyperCard system, and other technologies developed at Xerox PARC.

== Background ==
Kaehler is a son of a mechanical engineer and grew up tinkering with mechanical toys. During the 1960s, he built a computer on his own following an article published in Scientific American. He went to Gunn High School, a public school in Palo Alto, California. He graduated in 1968. While in high school, Kaehler was accepted to a summer job at then named Fairchild Industries. During this work, he learned the programming language Fortran. During his high school days, he was introduced to his first computer, an IBM 1620, operated by the Palo Alto Unified School District. Kaehler then attended Stanford University to study physics, studied programming under Donald Knuth, learned the language APL, and met Dan Ingalls. He graduated with a Bachelor of Science (B.S.) in physics in 1972. Later, Xerox began a pilot program with Gunn High School, loaning them a Xerox Alto.

== Xerox PARC ==
Ingalls introduced Kaehler to PARC when he secured a contract with Xerox. They formed a team that included George White, who was already with the company working on speech recognition software. During his early years at PARC, he attended Carnegie Mellon University. He graduated with a Master of Science (MSc) in computer science in 1976. By the 1980s, he was reportedly demonstrating a virtual reality (VR) technology that involved a user in Maze War 3D game. This depiction successfully voiced a response in-world to another user in the real world. The development has been touted as the first avatar-centric reference to this kind of VR technology.

Kaehler was also documented as one of the researchers at PARC who briefed Steve Jobs about the company's three innovations: the graphical user interface (GUI) of the Xerox Alto computer, Smalltalk, and Ethernet network at PARC.

=== Smalltalk ===
Kaehler was part of a group led by Dr. Alan Kay who refined the concept of network computing through Smalltalk. This is a system that drew from John McCarthy's language LISP and from simulation programming language Simula, versions 1 and 67, which were developed by the Norwegian Computing Center. In Kay's account of Smalltalk's early development, he cited key milestones attributed to Kaehler. According to Kay, along with Ingalls, Dave Robson, and Diana Merry, for instance, Kaehler successfully implemented the Smalltalk-76 system from scratch within a period of seven months. It constituted 50 classes that composed 180 pages of source code. Kaehler was also credited for designing the virtual memory system named Object-Oriented Zoned Environment (OOZE). This system gave Smalltalk more speed, and the development of a system tracer used to clone Smalltalk-76 since the technology can write out new virtual memories from their prior iterations.

With Smalltalk, Kaehler worked closely with two future Turing Award winners. He began a lifelong professional association with Alan Kay, as described herein. Kaehler also co-authored a book, A Taste of Smalltalk, with University of California, Berkeley professor David Patterson, future leader of the RISC-V movement.

== Apple ==
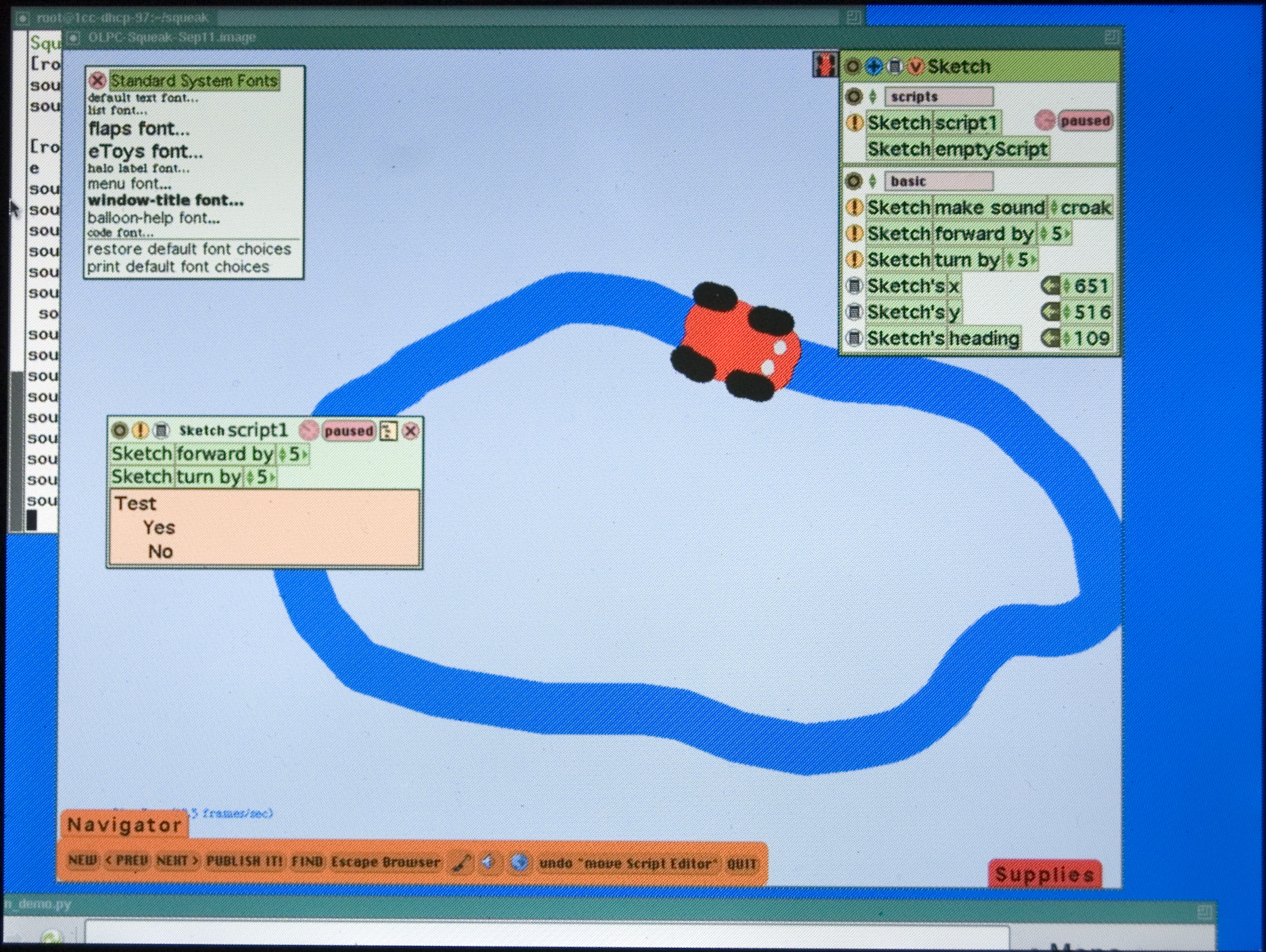
Squeak's EToys

In March 1985, Kaehler moved to Apple as a researcher. He became involved in the development of Macintosh computers, primarily providing technical support. However, Kaehler was more noted for improving other technologies such as the company's HyperCard system from 1985 to 1987. This is a tool that allows users to create entertainment and instructional content. Kaehler added an interface that made it possible to control videodiscs.

In 1996, while at Apple, Kaehler received a US patent for co-inventing user interface intermittent on-demand (pop up) halos around objects, with buttons to manipulate that object.

=== Squeak ===
Kaehler also became part of the open-source software community-supported Squeak Central Team in 1996, which also included Ingalls, John Maloney, Scott Wallace, and Andreas Raab. It was initially developed out of the Smalltalk-80 at Apple Research Laboratory and was later continued at Walt Disney Imagineering. Squeak was developed as an open and highly-portable language that is written fully in Smalltalk and included the EToys system, which allows children to see the software operation. The use of Smalltalk technology allows Squeak to be easier to debug, analyze, and change. Kaehler was credited for writing the code of the platform's painting system, Squeak Paintbox, and other EToys pilot versions.

== Personal life ==
In 1982, Kaehler wed Carol Nasby, who also worked at Apple for several years, wrote the first Macintosh Owners Guide, built the HyperCard Help System for version 1.0, and wrote the book HyperCard Power. In 1991, she died from complications of Type 1 diabetes.

In 1998, he wed his second wife Cynthia. She was a former preschool teacher for 25 years, and an artist who made fused glass pendants for necklaces and broaches. They lived in Las Vegas, Nevada and had three children. In 2020, she died from cancer.

== See also ==
- List of computer scientists
- List of programmers
