= Visual Smalltalk Enterprise =

- Original author: Digitalk
- Developers: Digitalk (1986–1995), Parc Place Systems (1995-1997)
- Final release: VSE v3.2.0 (a.k.a. VSE2000) / September 2000; 25 years ago
- Operating system: MS-DOS, Windows, OS/2
- Available in: English
- Type: Integrated Development Environment
- License: Commercial
- Website: cincomsmalltalk.com

Visual Smalltalk Enterprise (VSE) is a Smalltalk dialect that runs only on Microsoft Windows, and is the last in a long line of Smalltalk implementations first produced by Digitalk and now available through Cincom.

Active development has stopped since late 1997 and VSE is now only available as a version called VSE 2000, and only to licensed users of previous VSE versions.

== History ==
VSE has had a complicated history which starts with a product called Digitalk Smalltalk/V that ran from a DOS prompt and provided a windowing environment.

- Smalltalk/V (1986, MS-DOS)
- Smalltalk/V 286 (1988, MS-DOS)
- Smalltalk/V PM (1989, Presentation Manager under OS/2)
- Smalltalk/V Win (1991, Windows 3.x)
- Visual Smalltalk Enterprise (VSE) (1992, Windows 3.x)
- Visual Smalltalk Enterprise 3.0 (1995, Windows 95)

Before Smalltalk/V, the first commercial Smalltalk product from Digitalk was Digitalk Methods released in 1983. The windowing interface was not graphically based - instead it drew its windows using special symbols stored in a character format. Further, it predated the use of a mouse to drive the interface.

There have also been versions of Smalltalk/V for the Apple Macintosh and IBM OS/2 operating systems. A version for OS/2 was also available for VSE.

In July 1995 ParcPlace and Digitalk merged, later renaming the company to ObjectShare, and in 1997 the company announced it was moving away from Smalltalk and focus towards Java.

== PARTS Workbench ==
Visual Smalltalk Enterprise usually comes with another sub-system called the PARTS Workbench. This system allows the layout of components, which can then be connected using a visual representation of event-message links. Programmers can add scripts to particular components and build nested-components. They can also enhance the functionality of the main VSE Smalltalk system and use that within the PARTS Workbench.

Although the PARTS Workbench allows very easy development of small systems (somewhat after the style of Visual Basic) it is argued that it encourages fragmentary development. The natural style of using this system tends to lead to many links and scripts - it is not based around the idea of 'model' (as used in 'Model–View–Controller' approaches common in many Smalltalks as well as in other languages). However, as an 'HCI' for programmers, the PARTS Workbench has many features that are not in modern Smalltalks. It has an immediacy that makes it very good for introductory teaching and for rapidly implementing programs with visual interfaces.

== Copyrights, licensing ==
A result of the complex history is that the copyright and licensing situation is unclear and a typical recent VSE development environment is made up of many elements many of which were developed by third parties and sold separately but are now included with the distribution.

The situation with the most recent release (VSE 2000) is:

Element	Copyright Holder	License
Virtual machine	Seagull	Seagull owns VSE. Cincom has the right to sell it and provide support.
Base Classes	Unknown	Unknown
ObjectShare Classes	Cincom	Includes WindowBuilder, various WidgetKits, GF/ST, etc. As such, Cincom can (almost?) do anything it wants with those products (keeping mind the OEM DLL issues affecting two of the WidgetKits).
Profile/V	Kent Beck	Open Source, under the CPL 1.0 license (Though donations are appreciated). A performance profiler. Not actually part of the VSE distribution.

== People ==
A partial list of people that worked at Digitalk/ParcPlace on VSE:

Person	Comments
George Bosworth	Co-founder of Digitalk and co-creator of Smalltalk/V. Inventor of Ephemerons. Worked later on the garbage collector in the Microsoft .Net.
Jim Anderson	Co-founder of Digitalk and co-creator of Smalltalk/V.
Mike Teng	Co-founder of Digitalk and co-creator of Smalltalk/V.
Barbara Noparstak	Co-founder of Digitalk.
Lee Breisacher	Early employee of Digitalk and significant contributor to Smalltalk/V Win and PM and VSE.
Allen Wirfs-Brock	Chief scientist at Digitalk-ParcPlace. Currently works for Mozilla.
Eric Clayberg	Creator of WindowBuilder toolkit. Formerly Vice President of Development at Digitalk-ParcPlace.. Formerly Vice President of Product Development at Instantiations. Current board member of Instantiations.
Stephan B. Wessels	Digitalk Professional Services, frameworks development. , .
Suzanne Fortman	Digitalk Marketing. Joined Cincom as Smalltalk Program Director. Current Vice President of Marketing for PartnerOne. PartnerOne acquired Cincom June 2024.
Gary Gregory	Worked on VSE, PARTS, the VM and database interfaces. Now works at Seagull Software .
Dan Rubel	Worked on Subpanes/V. Former CTO of Instantiations
Roxie Rochat	Worked on Subpanes/V. Now works for Stoaks Software.
Bart Weller	Worked on Subpanes/V.
Ken Cooper	Worked on Subpanes/V. Got hired by Microsoft in 1997.
Ted Peters	Worked on Subpanes/V. Also got hired by Microsoft in 1997.
Mike Taylor	Was Vice President of Professional Services at Digitalk. Formerly CEO and president of Instantiations. Current board member of Instantiations.
Tim Rowledge	Worked on a lot of Smalltalk stuff at ParcPlace Systems Inc. Now works on Squeak.
