= Metatable =

Data holding structure that is designated to hold metadata

A metatable is the section of a database or other data holding structure that is designated to hold data that will act as source code or metadata. In most cases, specific software has been written to read the data from the metatables and perform different actions depending on the data it finds.

== See also ==
- Magic number (programming)
- Virtual method table
