= Newspeak (programming language) =

Programming language

- Paradigm: object-oriented, functional
- Family: Smalltalk: Self
- Designed by: Gilad Bracha
- Developers: Gilad Bracha, Peter von der Ahé, Vassili Bykov, Yaron Kashai, Ryan Macnak, William Maddox, Eliot Miranda
- First appeared: 2006; 20 years ago
- Stable release: Prototype / February 2013; 13 years ago
- Typing discipline: dynamic, optional
- Implementation language: C++, Newspeak, JavaScript
- OS: Windows 10, macOS, Linux, Android; web browsers
- License: Apache
- Website: newspeaklanguage.org

Major implementations
- Primordial Soup

Influenced by
- Smalltalk, Self, BETA, E

Newspeak is a programming language and platform in the tradition of Smalltalk and Self being developed by a team led by Gilad Bracha. The platform includes an integrated development environment (IDE), a graphical user interface (GUI) library, and standard libraries. Starting in 2006, Cadence Design Systems funded its development and employed the main contributors, but ended funding in January 2009.

== Overview ==
Newspeak is a class-based and message-based language. Classes may be nested, as in BETA. This is one of the key differences between Newspeak and Smalltalk.

Newspeak is distinguished by its unusual approach to modularity. The language has no global namespace. Top level classes act as module declarations. Modularity in Newspeak is based exclusively on class nesting. Module declarations are first class values (i.e., they may be stored in variables, passed as parameters, returned from methods, etc.) and are stateless.

By design the newspeak lacks undeclared access to a global scope and therefore enforces dependency injection. As consequence it requires all class dependencies (instance variables referred as by "slots") to be explicitly referenced. This makes every class in Newspeak virtual. All names of dependencies in Newspeak are late-bound (dynamically bound), and are interpreted as message sends, as in Self.

A notable feature of newspeak is its impossibility to directly access instance variables. It's done via automatically generated getters or setters.

=== Development ===
While developed at Cadence Newspeak was used to write its own IDE (compiler, debugger, class browsers, object inspectors, unit testing framework, a mirror based reflection API etc.), a portable GUI tool kit, an object serializer/deserializer, a parser combinator library, a regular expression package, core libraries for collections, streams, strings and files, parts of foreign function interface and CAD application code. The Newspeak platform as a whole took approximately 8 person years of work.

== Identity ==
The name Newspeak is inspired by the Newspeak language appearing in George Orwell's dystopian novel Nineteen Eighty-Four. The heading on the programming language's website says "It's doubleplusgood". The motive for the name is that Orwell's Newspeak language grew smaller with each revision; Bracha views this as a desirable goal for a programming language.

The language icon is supposed to be Big Brother's eye, as seen in page 3 of the documentation.

It should not be confused with the safety critical programming language of the same name designed by Ian Currie of RSRE in 1984, for use with the VIPER microprocessor. Its principal characteristic was that its compiler would ensure all potential exceptional behaviour is explicitly handled by the program.

== Implementation ==
Primordial Soup is a virtual machine (VM) that runs Newspeak binary snapshopts of serialized Newspeak files. Internal Object Representation was inspired by the Dart VM and provides basic VM primitives for the language. It can be compiled by SCons on various platforms.

== Code example ==
" A declaration of a class Point"
class Point x: i y: j = ( " This section is the instance initializer"
| "slots declarations are always between bars"
  public x ::= i. " ::= denotes slot initialization of a mutable slot"
  public y ::= j.
| )
(
  "A method"
  public printString = (
    ˆ ’x = ’, x printString, ’ y = ’, y printString
  )
)

"Instantiation of the Point to the `p` slot inside some class"
...
  public p := Point x: 42 y: 91.
...

== "Hello World" example ==
HelloBraveNewWorld usingPlatform: platform = ( 
 platform Transcript open show: 'Hello, Oh Brave new world'. 
)

== See also ==
- Generic programming – Style of computer programming
