= Dolphin Smalltalk =

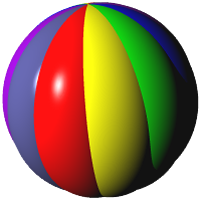
- Dolphin Smalltalk 7
- Paradigm: object-oriented
- Family: Smalltalk
- Designed by: Andy Bower, Blair McGlashan
- Developers: Intuitive Systems, Object Arts
- First appeared: 1 August 1997; 28 years ago
- Stable release: 7.1.24 / 19 June 2022; 3 years ago
- Preview release: 8.0 / January 2024; 1 year ago
- Typing discipline: objects, dynamic
- Scope: Lexical (static)
- Implementation language: Smalltalk
- Platform: IA-32, x86-64
- OS: Windows
- License: MIT
- Website: www.object-arts.com

Influenced by
- Smalltalk-80

Dolphin Smalltalk, or "Dolphin" for short, is an implementation of the programming language Smalltalk for Microsoft Windows.

The Dolphin 7 version release coincided with the project becoming free and open-source software under an MIT License.

Dolphin uses an integrated development environment. The toolset of this Smalltalk dialect include an integrated refactoring browser, a package browser and a WYSIWYG "view composer". Dolphin deviates from the conventional Smalltalk framework of model–view–controller (MVC), instead using model–view–presenter (MVP).

== Features ==
- Integration of the Refactoring Browser tools from Refactory Inc.
- Package-based browsing environment as an alternative to a conventional Smalltalk class hierarchy browser.
- A tabbed container to manage Dolphin browsers and tools and associating them together with a given idea or workflow. The goal is to save screen space and clutter and to help developers focus on their train of thought.
- Source code management very similar to the ENVY source code manager that was available for some other commercial Smalltalk dialects.
