= Diana Merry =

American computer programmer

Diana Merry-Shapiro
- Born: 1939 (age 86–87); Iowa, USA
- Occupation: Computer programmer
- Known for: 1st overlapping display windows and BitBLT co-inventor

Diana Merry-Shapiro (née Mayhugh; born August 25, 1939) is an American computer programmer.

Merry-Shapiro was born in Iowa. She graduated from Valparaiso University in 1961.

In the early 1970s, Merry-Shapiro began working as a secretary for Xerox PARC. She shifted from working as a secretary to becoming a computer programmer with PARC's Learning Research Group. As one of the original developers of the Smalltalk programming language, she helped write the first system for overlapping display windows. Merry-Shapiro was also a co-inventor of the BitBLT routines for Smalltalk, subroutines for performing computer graphics operations efficiently.

After leaving PARC in 1986, Merry-Shapiro worked as a financial software developer. As of 2003, she was still using Smalltalk as an employee of Suite LLC, a financial consulting firm. Merry-Shapiro retired in 2014.

== Personal life ==
Merry-Shapiro is a trans woman. She discussed her gender transition and experiences at the Casa Susanna resort in the 2022 documentary Casa Susanna.

Merry-Shapiro was previously married to a woman named Julie before her gender transition. In 1968, Merry-Shapiro married Don Merry; they later divorced. Merry-Shapiro met her current spouse, Carol Shapiro, in November 1986. They live in the New York metropolitan area.
