= Cincom Systems =

Multinational computer technology corporation

Cincom Systems, Inc.
- Company type: Private
- Industry: Computer software IT Services
- Founded: 1968
- Founders: Thomas M. Nies, Tom Richley, Claude Bogardus
- Fate: Sold to PartnerOne in 2024
- Headquarters: Riverside, California, United States
- Key people: Thomas M. Nies, Sr., Founder/CEO
- Products: CPQ Software; Customer Communications Management Software (CCM); Contact Center Software; Document Automation; Data Management; Application Development
- Website: www.cincom.com

Cincom Systems, Inc., is a privately held multinational computer technology corporation founded in 1968 by Tom Nies, Tom Richley, and Claude Bogardus. The company’s first product, Total, was the first commercial database management system that was not bundled with manufacturer hardware and proprietary software. In June 2024, Cincom Systems Inc. was acquired by PartnerOne, a Canada-based enterprise software company. At the time of the sale, Cincom had 400 employees both in the US and internationally.

== History ==
Cincom Systems was founded in 1968, when the product focus in the computer industry was far more on hardware than software, and mass merchandising in the industry was nonexistent. Cincom was quoted by IBM as being "the original database company" in 2017.

By the late 1960s, Tom Nies, a salesman and project manager at IBM, had noticed that software was becoming a more important component of computer systems and decided to work for a business that sold software. The only software businesses in existence at that time were a small number of service bureaus, none of which was located in Cincinnati, where Nies resided. Convinced that software was a potential profit center, rather than a drain on profits, as was then viewed by IBM management, Thomas M. Nies, left IBM late 1968 and brought along Tom Richley and Claude Bogardus. This executive trio functioned as sales and marketing (Nies), product development (Richley), and research and development (Bogardus). In 1968 Nies joined Claude Bogardus and Tom Richley to found Cincom Systems. The name Cincom comes from the portmanteau of "Cincinnati" and "computer". This is due to the company being founded in Cincinnati, Ohio. Now its headquarter in Riverside, California, United States. The company initially only wrote programs for individual companies. By March 1969, the company became a full-service organization by adding principals Judy Foegle Carlson (administration), George Fanady (custom systems), Doug Hughes (systems engineering), and Jan Litton (product installation).

Within its first year, the company realized that it was solving the same data management problems for its various clients. Nies proposed the solution of developing a core database management system that could be sold to multiple customers. Total was the result of this development effort. As the company’s first product, Total, was the first commercial database management system that was not bundled with manufacturer hardware and proprietary software. At a time when each application program "owned" the data it used, a company often had multiple copies of similar information:

"... people would get five different reports and the inventory balances would say five different things. What were our sales during April? Well, you'd get five different numbers, depending on how you total things up."

The problem was known, and CODASYL's Database Task Group Report wrote about it, as did General Electric and IBM. Cincom's TOTAL "segregated out the programming logic from the application of the database."

Despite IBM being "where the money was," there was still the problem of compatibility between large systems running OS/360 or small systems running DOS/360, so they "implemented 70 to 80 percent of the application programming logic in such a way that it insulated the user from" whichever they used; some used both.

Starting in 1971, Cincom opened offices in Canada, England, Belgium, France, Italy, Australia, Japan, Brazil and Hong Kong.

By 1980, TOTAL product sales reached $250 million.On August 20, 1984, U.S. President Ronald Reagan called Cincom and Tom Nies "the epitome of entrepreneurial spirit of American business." Cincom Systems was described in 2001 as "a venerable software firm, included in the Smithsonian national museum along with Microsoft as a software pioneer." In 2007, Cincom generated over $100 million in revenue for the 21st straight year, a feat unmatched by any private software publisher in the world. Microsoft (a public company) is the only other software publisher in the world to reach this milestone.

From 1968 until February 2017, Nies served as Cincom Systems president. He also served as chairman. Greg Mills became President. By 2021, Nies was considered the longest actively serving CEO in the computer industry.

In June 2024, Cincom Systems Inc. was acquired by PartnerOne, a Canada-based enterprise software company. Terms of the deal were not disclosed at the time, and Cincom's founder Tom Nies stepped down from his post at the company to retire. He had been CEO of Cincom since its founding in 1968, making him the longest actively serving CEO in the computer industry. At the time of the sale, Cincom had 400 employees both in the US and internationally.

== Product history ==
=== 1968 to 1969 ===
Initially the company simply wrote programs for local companies. They would use the data management aspects of many programs with reasonable similarities to develop the product called Total, which was seen as an improvement and generalization of IBM's DBOMP.

Other than IBM, which was still in the "selling iron" business, Cincom became the first U.S. software firm to promote the concept of a database management system (DBMS). Cincom delivered the first commercial database management system that was not bundled with a computer manufacturer's hardware and proprietary software.

=== 1970s and 1980s ===
Cincom introduced several new products during the 1970s, including:

- ENVIRON/1 (1971), a control system for teleprocessing networks.
- SOCRATES (1972), a data retrieval system for receiving reports from the TOTAL database system.
- T-ASK (1975), an Interactive Query Language for Harris computers.
- MANTIS (1978), an application generator. It has developed enough of a following to still be the focus of attention in 2017.
- Manufacturing Resource Planning System (1979), a packaged ERP field data system for manufacturers that is the ancestor of today's CONTROL system.

New products introduced in the 1980s included:

- EPOCH-FMS (1980), a directory-driven financial management system.
- Series 80 Data Control System (1980), an interactive online data dictionary.
- TOTAL Information System (1982), a directory-driven database management system.
- ULTRA (1983), an interactive database management system for DEC's VAX hardware and VMS operating system. This offering was part of a strategic move to recognize DEC, and quickly resulted in one out of five customer product purchases being for VAX systems.
- PC CONTACT (1984), a fully integrated, single-step communications facility that interactively linked an IBM mainframe computer with the user's IBM personal computer.
- MANAGE User Series (1984), an integrated, decision-support system that combined extensive personal computing capabilities with the power and control of the mainframe.
- SUPRA for SQL (structured query language) (1989).
- CASE Environment (1989), a series of integrated components that assisted users who were facing cross-platform development demand from multiple areas within their computers.
- Comprehensive Planning & Control System (CPCS) (1989), a resource and project guidance system that centralized management of resources and activities.

=== 1990s ===
New products during the 1990s, included:

- AD/Advantage (1991), an application development system that automated development and maintenance activities throughout all phases of the application life cycle. AD/Advantage is a component f MANTIS.
- XpertRule (1993), a knowledge specification and generation system.
- TOTAL FrameWork (1995), a set of object-oriented frameworks, services and integrated development environments (IDEs) for the assembly and maintenance of Smalltalk, Java, C++ and Visual Basic business applications.
- Cincom Acquire (1995), an integrated selling system for companies that deliver complex products and services.
- AuroraDS (1995), an enterprise-wide solution that allowed organizations to automate document creation, production, output and management in a client/server environment.
- SPECTRA (1997), a system that provided customer administration and resource efficiency for telecommunications, utilities and service industries.
- gOOi (1997), a solution that turns traditional server-based applications into graphical integrated desktop (client) applications.
- Cincom Encompass (1998), a suite of integrated components for next-generation call centers.
- Cincom Smalltalk (1999), a suite that includes VisualWorks and the ObjectStudio Enterprise development environment.
- Cincom iC Solutions (1999), a technology that combines sales and marketing automation with knowledge-based support for product and service configuration.

=== 2000 to the present ===
New products include:

- Cincom Knowledge Builder (2001), a business-rules management system that streamlines sales and service processes by providing advice and guidance at the point of customer interaction.
- Cincom TIGER (2002), a tool that integrates all data sources within an organization.
- Cincom Synchrony (2004), a customer-experience management system for multi-channel contact centers.
