= Oracle Labs =

Research branch of Oracle Corporation

Oracle Labs (formerly Sun Microsystems Laboratories, or Sun Labs) is a research and development branch of Oracle Corporation. The labs were created when Oracle acquired Sun Microsystems. Sun Labs was established in 1990 by Ivan Sutherland and Robert Sproull. The initial locations were in Menlo Park, California and Burlington, Massachusetts, United States.

Oracle Labs has locations in Redwood Shores, California; Burlington, Massachusetts; Cambridge, UK; Brisbane, Australia; Linz, Austria; Zürich, Switzerland; and Casablanca, Morocco.

== Sun ==
Sun Labs worked in areas such as asynchronous circuits, optical communications, new web technologies, Java technologies, and computer networks. James G. Mitchell directed the labs starting in 2000. When asked in 2007 why Sun continued to put resources into research as the market turned to commodity pricing, chief executive Jonathan I. Schwartz said, "You need to spend enormous amounts of money to differentiate."

== Oracle ==
In 2010 after Sun was purchased by Oracle Corporation, it became Oracle Labs. As of April 2011 Sproull was director. He was appointed in June 2006.
