= OpenQwaq =

Software

- Developers: Alan Kay, David Smith, Andreas Raab, David Reed, Ron Teitelbaum, Eliot Miranda, Community source
- Release: 2011
- Written in: Squeak-Smalltalk
- Operating system: macOS, Windows, Linux
- Available in: English
- Type: Virtual workspaces, video conferencing, collaboration
- License: GNU GPL v2
- Repository: www.github.com/itsmeront/openqwaq

OpenQwaq is open source computer software for immersive collaboration, which enables organizations to implement online 3D virtual world workspaces for their specific needs. OpenQwaq is based on the Teleplace technology, a conferencing platform that has been in the market since 2007, with the name Qwaq Forums until 2009.

== History ==
Both OpenQwaq and Teleplace are based on the Squeak open source implementation of Smalltalk and the Croquet Project. The main developers of this family of technologies include Alan Kay, David Smith, Andreas Raab, Ron Teitelbaum, Eliot Miranda and David Reed, whose 1978 doctoral thesis on naming and synchronizations in a decentralized computer system introduced many of the main concepts. Teleplace virtual workspaces were used by companies, universities, organizations and U.S. government agencies, such as the Air Force, Army, Navy and Department of Veterans Affairs for training and collaboration, have applications to telepresence based e-learning, and have been used for popular interactive online technology talks. Teleplace ceased operations in December 2011. 3D ICC Purchased the IP from Teleplace in 2012. The commercial product is now called Virtend.

=== Initial release ===
OpenQwaq was announced on the Teleplace blog and other IT news sites in May 2011.

The initial release of OpenQwaq was functionally equivalent to Teleplace with the exception of the video subsystem used for webcam videoconferencing, video playback and session recording, because the proprietary video codecs used in Teleplace could not be included as open source. Developers have then integrated in OpenQwaq the open source video and audio codecs used in the VLC media player. Following a standard open source technology business model, companies offering value added OpenQwaq hosting and consulting services have been formed. In 2022 3D Immersive Collaboration Corp renamed Immersive Terf to Virtend™

== Features ==
- VOIP
- Fully Interactive Applications
  - Document

Spreadsheet
Presentations
PDF
Whiteboard
Firefox Web Browser

- Avatar

Simple

Allows for custom face image and badge
Allows Web Cam to be displayed as face

Animated Avatar

OGRE 24 bone
Supports Biovision Hierarchy (BVH) animations

Balloon Head

With string!

- Webcams
- Digital video recording
- Webcasting
- Sound files
- Python Scripting of 2d applications and 3d objects
- Meeting controls
- Drag and drop 3D objects

Google Earth (kmz)
Collada (obj)
VRML (wrl)
3ds Max (ase)

== Uses ==
The teleXLR8 project, an online talk program previously based on Teleplace, restarted in August 2011 on OpenQwaq.

=== QUBE ===
QUBE is a software program based on OpenQwaq. It was developed by Pentacle (The Virtual Business School), who use it as a virtual classroom for their executive education courses.

=== Virtend ===
Virtend is the latest version of the Qwaq/Teleplace software owned by 3D ICC.

== See also ==
- Open Cobalt – another open source collaboration application based on the Croquet Project
- www.3dicc.com - Virtend
