= David A. Smith (computer scientist) =

American computer scientist (born 1957)

David Alan Smith (born 1957 in Camp Lejeune, North Carolina) is an American computer scientist, entrepreneur, and CTO of the Croquet Corporation. He has focused on interactive 3D and using 3D as a basis for new user environments and entertainment for over twenty years.

== Early career ==
He began his programming life as a corporate analyst at Thermo Electron Corporation, where he worked to develop an enterprise-wide multi-user multidimensional hierarchical spreadsheet program in the APL programming language. In 1982, Smith went to work for Richard Greenblatt and Lucia Vaina as a programmer for Softrobotics, an affiliate of Lisp Machines, Inc. where he worked to develop an expert system for the diagnosis of brain damage using an Apple II as the front end to a Lisp Machine. In 1984, he moved back to the Special Projects Laboratory at Thermo Electron to work for Stelianos Pezaris (Sutherland-Pezaris headmount and Pezaris Array Multiplier), where he designed a process control application and helped to design a multiprocessor distributed controller architecture for a robotic PC plating system.

== Staff Scientist ==
Smith then moved to the Thomas Lord Research Center in 1986 as a staff scientist working on intelligent object manipulation using robotic tactile sensors, pneumo-elastic and mechanical hands. There he developed a telepresence system using stereo-optics and a dataglove controlling a Puma-560 robot equipped with the pneumo-elastic hand.

Smith has been nominated by the Lockheed Martin to be one of the USA Science and Engineering Festival's Nifty Fifty Speakers who will speak about his work and career to middle and high school students in October 2010.

== Interactive Games ==
In 1987, Smith created The Colony, the very first 3D interactive game and precursor to today's first-person shooters. The game was developed for the Apple Macintosh and soon won the "Best Adventure Game of the Year" award from MacWorld Magazine. In 1989, Smith used the technologies developed for the game to create a virtual set and virtual camera system that was used by James Cameron for the movie The Abyss. Based upon this experience, Smith founded Virtus Corporation in 1990, and developed Virtus Walkthrough, the first real-time 3D design application for personal computers. Smith also co-founded several other companies including Red Storm Entertainment with Tom Clancy, Timeline Computer Entertainment with Michael Crichton, and Neomar, a wireless enterprise infrastructure company.

== Croquet Project ==
Smith was one of six principal architects of the Croquet Project (along with Alan Kay, Julian Lombardi, Andreas Raab, David P. Reed, and Mark P. McCahill). Development of the Croquet Project moved to the Open Cobalt project in 2009. He was co-founder Teleplace, Inc. (formerly Qwaq) which was focused on developing Croquet technology into a solution for the enterprise. Teleplace ceased operations in 2011.

In 2018, Smith founded the Croquet corporation with other engineers from the project. In 2020, the company raised a seed round, branding its main product, Croquet OS, as "the Operating System for the Open Metaverse".

== Other work ==
Smith worked at Wearality Corporation on the Virtual World Framework. He is the co-founder of a machine learning company called Tanjo.ai.
