= Tweak programming environment =

Graphical user interface layer for the Squeak development environment

Tweak is a graphical user interface (GUI) layer written by Andreas Raab for the Squeak development environment, which in turn is an integrated development environment based on the Smalltalk-80 computer programming language. Tweak is an alternative to an earlier graphic user interface layer called Morphic. Development began in 2001.

Applications that use the Tweak software include Sophie (version 1), a multimedia and e-book authoring system, and a family of virtual world systems: Open Cobalt, Teleplace, OpenQwaq, 3d ICC's Immersive Terf and the Croquet Project.

== Influences ==
An experimental version of Etoys, a programming environment for children, used Tweak instead of Morphic. Etoys was a major influence on a similar Squeak-based programming environment known as Scratch.
