= Office of the future =

The office of the future is a collection of ideas for redesigning the office. As technology and society have evolved, the definition of the office of the future has changed. Current concepts, dating from the 1940s, are now known as the "paperless office".

== History ==
In a 1920 advertisement, Art Metal company boasted of its contribution to the office of the future—steel office equipment. In a 1928 advertisement for typewriters, Remington Rand described "the business office of the future", using its "Quiet Typewriter", as quiet, open, scientifically arranged, and efficient. In 1935, the Marquette Building in Chicago created a model office of the future to show prospective tenants. This featured high-intensity lighting, "color...to give the impression of great roominess", an "efficient" layout. The Johnson Wax Headquarters, designed by Frank Lloyd Wright and completed in 1939, featured "many advanced structural, lighting, heating and equipment ideas. A follow-up article touted the productivity improvement due to air-conditioning. On "the hottest day of July" the reporter found "work there proceeding in air-conditioned comfort with no apparent let-down of any kind," as opposed to other offices visited the same day, which experienced a 40-50% let-down.

== Memex desk and related machines ==
The first practical modern office of the future concept was probably the series of machines which were presented in Life magazine in September 1945. Life magazine hired an illustrator from Sperry Rand, Alfred D. Crimi, to make drawings of the concepts Vannevar Bush had presented a few months earlier in The Atlantic Monthly magazine under the title "As We May Think."

The Memex article in The Atlantic is most often cited because of its longer text which details the proposal of a system of shared microfilm based hyperlinks which could be considered as a precursor to the World Wide Web. "Wholly new forms of encyclopedias will appear, ready-made with a mesh of associative trails running through them." Those citations tend to overlook the massive organization it would have taken to mail all those microfilm reels between scientists, and eventually between any knowledge worker, in order to make the system work. The citations also tend to overlook that Memex was an entire system, composed not only of a massive desk which housed the microfilm hyperlinking equipment, and the microfilm library but also of a speech activated typewriter (also capable of speech synthesis from normal paper text) and other accessories. Also overlooked is the difficulty of making large volumes of printed material readable by machine through optical character recognition.

Bush's predictions are notable for the fact that many have now become reality: the wearable camera ("Cyclops"), xerography ("dry photography"), speech-to-text ("vocoder"), and computers ("thinking machines"). Only microfilm has become obsolete, and the desk-size "Memex" is now a device as small as a smart phone or tablet.

Many concepts for future computer systems were presented in the 1960s and 1970s, but none really touched office work as much as the Memex or had such a lasting impact.

== Xerox ==
In 1970, under Chairman Joseph C. Wilson, Xerox founded the Palo Alto Research Center (PARC) to conduct basic research and develop the technologies for the office of the future. Among other advances, PARC developed the first personal computer, the Alto in 1970, the first tablet computer, Alan Kay's Dynabook in 1972, and the first laser printer in 1973. "The Alto was a wild departure from the computers that preceded it. It was built to tuck under a desk, with its monitor, keyboard, and mouse on top. It was totally interactive, responding directly to its single user."

"Despite [the Alto's] age, using it feels so familiar and natural that it’s sometimes difficult to appreciate just how extraordinary, how different it was when it first appeared." The user can interact with the computer by pointing and clicking with a mouse and typing on a keyboard. ... [U]sing a word processor with the core features and functions of Microsoft Word, Google Docs, or LibreOffice’s Writer, along with an email client that could be mistaken for a simplified version of Apple Mail, Microsoft Outlook, or Mozilla Thunderbird.... Its networking capabilities can link me to other computers and to high-quality laser printers." "[T]he Alto came to shape our lives with computers a half century later."

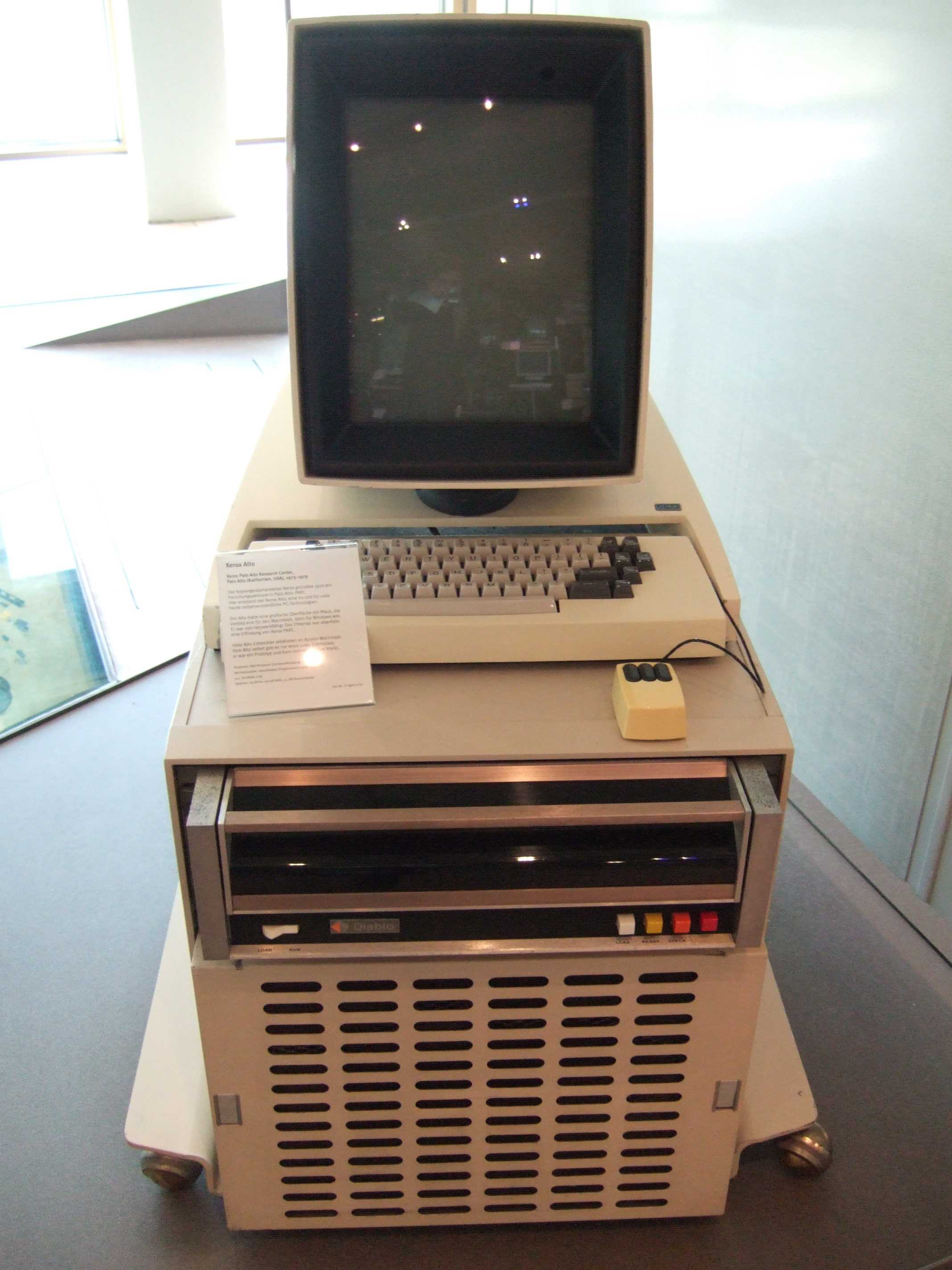
Alto with CPU (under desk), display, keyboard, and mouse

In 1977, Xerox introduced the Alto to the world at the Xerox World Conference in Boca Raton. At that point, Xerox was already running some 400 Altos internally. Bob Taylor, head of PARC's Computer Science Laboratory demonstrated the machine that he believed "would be transformational, eliminating much of what he called the 'drudgery of office work' and freeing office workers “to attend to higher-level functions."

In 1981, Xerox introduced the Xerox 8010 Information System (Xerox Star), in an attempt to capitalize on the Alto's technology. The Star was originally sold as part of an integrated Xerox "personal office system" that also connected to other workstations and network services via Ethernet. Possibly because of its high price, and the high buy-in cost of a complete office system, the Star was not a commercial success.

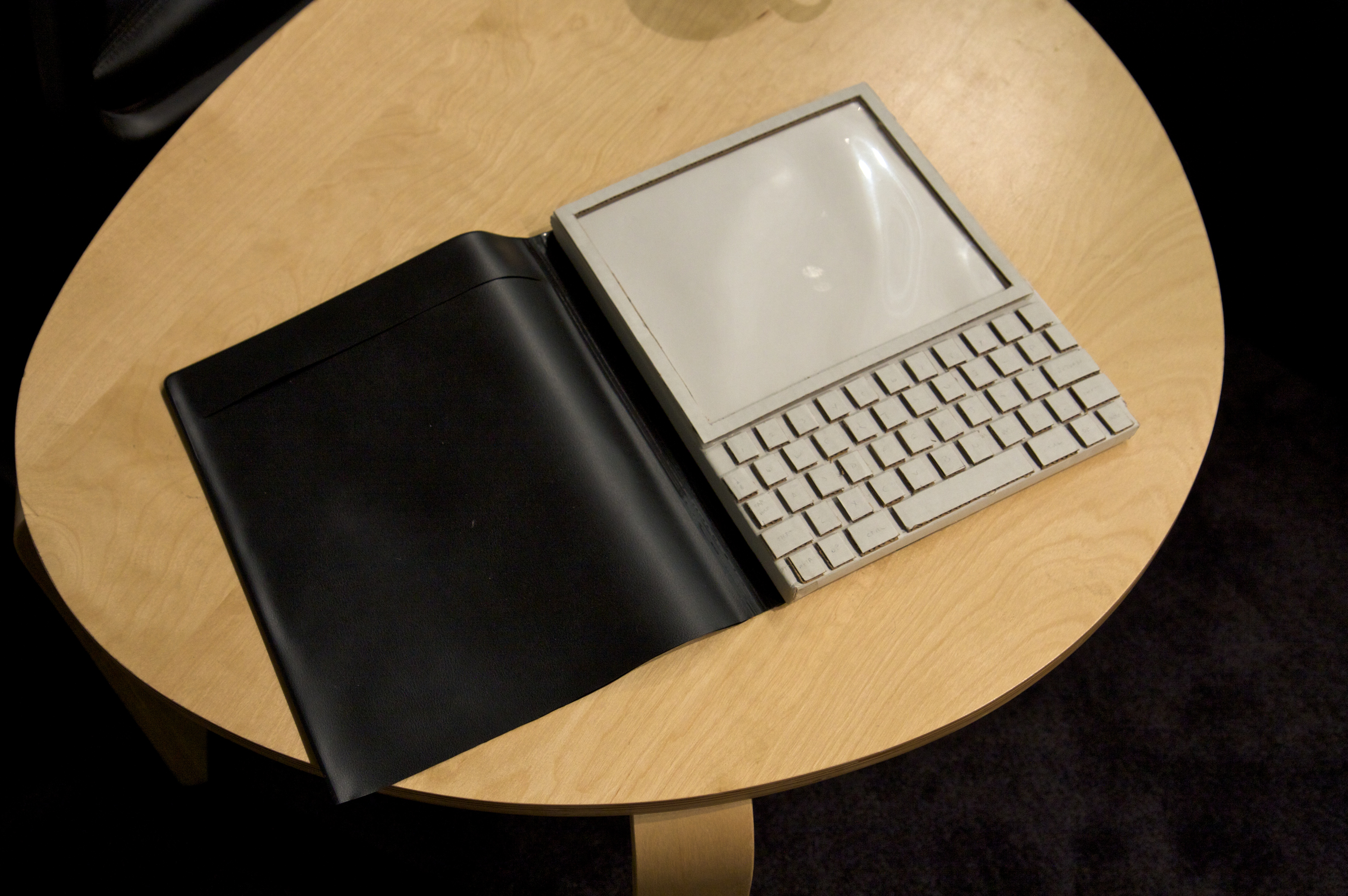
Dynabook prototype

The Dynabook idea (presented by Alan Kay and the Xerox PARC) proposed a portable slate-like personal computer which could have been used in an office but which was really an extremely personal exploration tool, meant more to draw art, compose music or invent new algorithms than to write a business letter. The tablet idea was slower to catch on, and the popular Apple iPad was only introduced nearly forty years later, in 2010.

== Starfire video prototype ==
Sun Microsystems presented a complete office of the future concept when it made its Starfire video prototype public in 1994. Like the Memex system, The Starfire prototype has been sometimes touted as predicting the birth of the World Wide Web. While it is true that we see the heroine "navigating" what the narrator describes as a "vast information space" this takes up but a few seconds at the beginning of the 15 minute Starfire video.

The Starfire is much more than a Web navigating machine. The Starfire video shows in the rest of the 15 minutes a large panoply of hardware and software concepts such as a gestural interface, total integration with public telephony and other innovations. Like the Memex system the Starfire has a large, massive desk as its central feature, and proposes compatible devices in complement to the desk, such as a laptop with a chorded keyboard and advanced videoconferencing. Bruce Tognazzini was the principal driver behind the project, with the collaboration of many other Sun alumni including Jakob Nielsen, and the help of external consultants.

== Microsoft and IBM prototypes ==
The two most recent integrated visions of the digital office of the future have come from Microsoft and IBM, with opposing characteristics. The D# screen and its Broadbench software look like an informatician's dream workspace, in opposition to the computer science or software developer culture prevalent at Microsoft. The Bluespace prototype is characterized as an ambitious young IBM salesperson, in potential contrast to the salesperson-centric culture prevalent within IBM.

The D#-Broadbench curves around a single user, making physically close collaborative work difficult. The gentle curve helps enhance concentration, while its massive size makes it unsuitable for the typical cubicle and perfect for a small closed office, for instance the office of every software developer at Microsoft.

The Bluespace prototype is filled with enhancements meant to manage and control the flow of disturbances coming to a user but not to completely stop them or discourage them in any definitive way. All of the elements are small enough to fit into a typical cubicle or even a smaller one than the norm. While the screens and other devices surround the user, they are flexible enough to permit physical teamwork between two or three more other users coming into the cubicle.

Both prototypes require considerable work to be adapted to what most managers or professionals consider a "real" desk, that is a pedestal desk, located in a closed office. They would also require rework and re-think to be adapted to the types of desks which are found in home offices or small business offices, such as the armoire desk.

Teams at IBM Research and Microsoft Research are currently working on perfecting these prototypes.

== Art and beauty ==
At the beginning of the year 2001 the Museum of Modern Art (MoMA) in New York city presented a 3 month long exhibit called "Workspheres", which explored the role of industrial designers in creating what were intended to be effective and aesthetic solutions to present and future office environment issues.

Among the 151 objects or ensembles presented there were 6 works commissioned specifically for the exhibition, from experienced industrial design companies like IDEO. While some of the works had practical aspects, they were all chosen for their artistic impact. A complete catalogue of the exhibition was produced and a special website, with its own distinctive artistic interface, was put on line.

"Office of the Future" is also the name of an ongoing research project (based at the Department of Computer Science, University of North Carolina at Chapel Hill) which began among a consortium of universities sponsored by the National Science Foundation.

== See also ==
- Intelligence amplification
- Memex
- Mobile office
- Paperless office
- Home of the future
