= Reproductive Toxicology (journal) =

- Discipline: Toxicology, reproductive biology
- Language: English
- Edited by: Dr Anna Bal-Price

Publication details
- History: 1987-present
- Publisher: Elsevier
- Frequency: Bimonthly
- Impact factor: 3.3 (2023)

Standard abbreviations
- ISO 4: Reprod. Toxicol.

Indexing
- ISSN: 0890-6238

Links
- Journal homepage

Reproductive Toxicology is a peer-reviewed journal published bimonthly by Elsevier which focuses on the effects of toxic substances on the reproductive system. The journal was established in 1987 and is affiliated with the European Teratology Society. According to the Journal Citation Reports, the journal has a 2023 impact factor of 3.3.
