= Unily =

British software company

Unily is a British software company that develops intranet and employee-experience software for organizations.

== History ==
In June 2019, Unily received a reported $68 million growth investment from Silversmith Capital Partners and Farview Equity Partners.

In December 2021, CVC Growth Funds agreed to acquire a majority stake in the company.

== Products ==
Unily is discussed by industry analysts and publications as part of the intranet and digital workplace software market.

== Recognition ==
The Nielsen Norman Group has listed Unily among the technologies and platforms used by organizations featured in its annual intranet design coverage.
