= David P. Reed =

American computer scientist (born 1952)

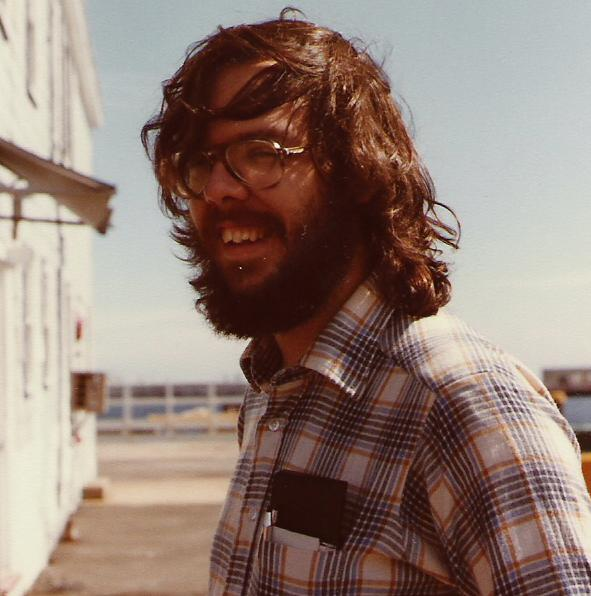
- David P. Reed
- Born: David Patrick Reed; January 31, 1952 (age 74)
- Education: MIT
- Known for: TCP/IP; UDP; Multiversion concurrency control
- Scientific career
- Fields: Computer science
- Workplaces: Lotus Development; MIT; Hewlett-Packard; Interval Research
- Thesis: Processor multiplexing in a layered operating system (1976)
- Doctoral advisor: Jerome H. Saltzer

David Patrick Reed (born January 31, 1952) is an American computer scientist, educated at the Massachusetts Institute of Technology, known for a number of significant contributions to computer networking and wireless communications networks.

He was involved in the early development of TCP/IP, and was the designer of the User Datagram Protocol (UDP), though he finds this title "a little embarrassing". He was also one of the authors of the original paper about the end-to-end principle, End-to-end arguments in system design, published in 1984.

He is also known for Reed's law, his assertion that the utility of large networks, particularly social networks, can scale exponentially with the size of the network.

From 2003 to 2010, Reed was an adjunct professor at the MIT Media Lab, where he co-led the Viral Communications group and the Communication Futures program. He was a senior vice president of the Chief Scientist Group at SAP Labs. In 2023 he founded MEXT, a predictive memory optimization software house based in Santa Clara, California. MEXT was acquired by Advanced Micro Devices in June 2026.

He is one of six principal architects of the Croquet project (along with Alan Kay, Julian Lombardi, Andreas Raab, David A. Smith, and Mark McCahill). He is also on the advisory board of TTI/Vanguard.

His 1978 dissertation introduced multiversion concurrency control (MVCC). MVCC is a concurrency control method commonly used by database management systems to provide concurrent access to the database and in programming languages to implement transactional memory.
