= Adele Goldberg (computer scientist) =

American computer scientist

Dr. Adele Goldberg
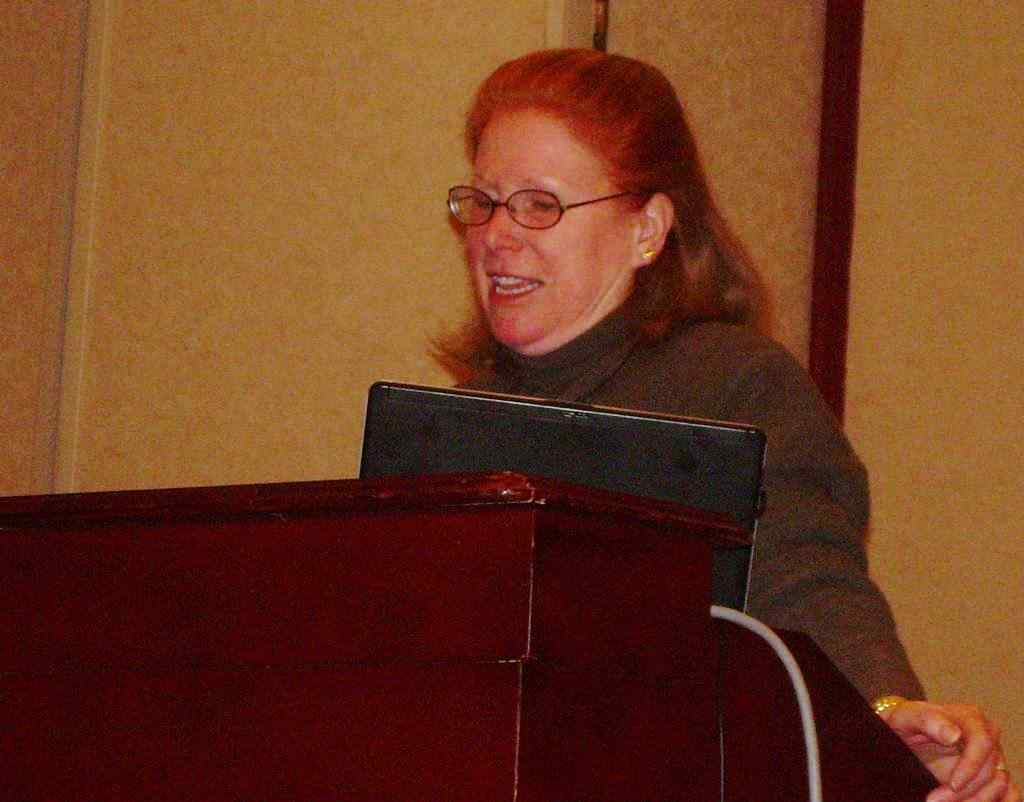
- Dr. Adele Goldberg at Python Conference (PyCon) 2007
- Born: July 22, 1945 (age 81); Cleveland, Ohio, United States
- Education: University of Michigan; University of Chicago
- Known for: Smalltalk System
- Scientific career
- Fields: Computer science
- Workplaces: Xerox PARC, Association for Computing Machinery, Stanford University
- Thesis: Computer-Assisted Instruction: The Application of Theorem-proving to Adaptive Response Analysis (1973)

Adele J. Goldberg (born July 22, 1945) is an American computer scientist. She was a co-developer of the programming language Smalltalk-80, an early object-oriented programming language that opened the opportunity to think about programming in a different and new way, that also influenced the design of languages such as Python, Objective-C, and Java, where they were used for some of the mobile applications and developed many concepts related to object-oriented programming, while a researcher at the Xerox Palo Alto Research Center (PARC) from the mid 1970s to the late 1980s. She worked alongside her coworkers Dan Ingalls and Alan Kay.

== Early life and education ==
Goldberg was born in Cleveland, Ohio, on July 22, 1945. Her family relocated to Chicago, Illinois, when she was 11, where she spent the rest of her childhood. She enjoyed problem solving and mathematics from a young age. In high school, she was in Student Council, but then realized this wasn't her area of interest. She was encouraged by her teachers to pursue mathematics. In 1963, Goldberg decided to attend the University of Michigan. While she attended the University of Michigan, she also worked at IBM during the summer and self taught herself computer programming. She considered Ann Arbor a big change from her Chicago lifestyle, mentioning her hardships in adapting to life separated for the first time from her twin sister. Mathematics as a degree shielded her from the social instability of the country– President John F. Kennedy had been assassinated that year, among other significant events. Math and science were an opportunity for her to dedicate time into her studies and avoid social situations. She spent three years at the university, took a semester off to travel in Europe, and later returned to complete her degree. In 1967, she completed her studies and earned a bachelor's degree in mathematics at the University of Michigan. Her interest in mathematics eventually led her to pursue graduate studies in information science at the University of Chicago.

Interested in computing, Goldberg worked as an intern at IBM during the summer of her junior year of college, where she learned how to program unit record machines. In the summer of 1966, after her junior year at the University of Michigan, Goldberg worked at an IBM Installation Center, there, she gained hands-on experience programming unit record machines using physical boards and wires. This experience introduced her to practical computing before she pursued her graduate studies in information science at the University of Chicago. After graduating, she attended the University of Chicago, where she received her master's (1969) and PhD (1973) degrees in information science. She completed her dissertation, "Computer-Assisted Instruction: The Application of Theorem-proving to Adaptive Response Analysis",which involved an early AI application she worked on developing. While working as a research associate at Stanford University. She also served as a visiting researcher at Stanford. After completing her PhD, Goldberg briefly worked as a professor in Rio de Janeiro, Brazil, before joining Xerox PARC in 1973 as a research scientist. In California, during a meeting of the Association for Computing Machinery Special Interest Group on Computer Users in Education (ACM SIGCSE), Adele met John Stoch, a XEROX employee, where they talked about a potential computer designed for children's education, called Dynabook.

== Career ==
=== 1973 ===
Goldberg began working at PARC in 1973 as a laboratory and research assistant, and eventually became manager of the System Concepts Laboratory where she, Alan Kay, and other researchers developed the programming language Smalltalk-80. At the time, it was not common for female computer scientists, nonetheless, Alan Kay, the leader of the design and development of first modern computer interface, hired a pregnant Adele Goldberg. This language developed the object-oriented approach of Simula 67 and introduced a programming environment of overlapping windows on graphic display screens. This new “personal computer,” with its key features including portability, network connection, communication with others, build models, and content sharing capabilities was the objective of Smalltalk at the time. This would later become the basis of future operating systems that we use today.

Smalltalk's innovative format was simple to use and customizable. Objects could be transferred among applications with minimal effort. Goldberg and Kay were involved in the development of design templates, forerunners of the design patterns later used in software design. Adele says that Smalltalk took inspiration from another language, which was created in the Sixties, Simula. Smalltalk 72, one of the iterations, was the first to feature low-level animations, and music. Adele and her team paired up with Doug Engelbart, the original inventor of the mouse, to see the possibilities of its incorporation to Smalltalk with the goal of better access, avoiding command lines with funny syntax. Smalltalk 72 was Adele's first opportunity to “teach” and explain this model to anyone.

=== 1976 ===
Along with Kay, she wrote the influential article "Personal Dynamic Media", which predicted a world in which ordinary individuals would use notebook computers to exchange, modify, and redistribute personal media. This paper outlined the vision for the Dynabook. She emphasized the vision of a small device, being able to be carried anywhere, that could give out information in quantities approaching that of human sensory systems, where the output had to be higher quality than newspapers. This paper outlined the vision for Dynabook.

=== 1979 ===
Adele refused to give a demonstration of Smalltalk when asked by Steve Jobs and his engineering team. She was worried that Apple would take the technology for themselves.

=== 1981 ===
Adele was very passionate about Smalltalk, spending lots of time promoting her creation. In 1981, BYTE magazine featured Smalltalk, where she personally helped write and edit an article, with the goal of introducing and normalizing object-oriented programming as a necessity in today's developing and technologically dependent society.

=== 1984 ===
Many of the concepts developed by Goldberg and her team at PARC became the basis for graphical user interfaces. According to Goldberg, Steve Jobs demanded a demonstration of the Smalltalk System, which she at first refused to give him, although her superiors eventually compelled her to comply. Apple eventually took many of the ideas used in the Xerox Alto and their implementations and used them as the basis for their Apple Macintosh desktop environment.

=== 1986 ===
Between 1984 through 1986, Goldberg was president of the Association for Computing Machinery. Her previous roles included national secretary and editor-in-chief of ACM's Computing Surveys, being awarded the 1987 ACM Software Systems Award along with her colleagues Ingalls and Kay for the development of Smalltalk.

=== 1988 ===
In 1988, Goldberg left PARC to cofound ParcPlace Systems, a company that created development tools for Smalltalk-based applications. Most of her work at PARC is the foundation for today's graphically based user interfaces, which replace earlier command line base systems. There, she served as chairwoman and CEO until its 1995 merger with Digitalk. She also cofounded Neometron, Inc. an Internet support provider focused on exploring new approaches to remote group work in 1999. She works at Bullitics. She continues to pursue her interest in education, formulating computer science courses at community colleges in the United States and abroad. She is a board member and adviser at Cognito Learning Media, a provider of multimedia software for science education. Goldberg later cofounded Agile Mind, a company that provides online and classroom support for K–12 math and science teachers and students. She currently serves as deputy chair of the Scientific Advisory Board of the Heidelberg Institute for Theoretical Studies (HITS) in Heidelberg, Germany.

== Achievements and accolades ==
The Dynabook mission remains to create the medium, both the creative modeling environment and the curriculum, to upend how kids can share their understanding of how things work, and be challenged as to whether that understanding reflects an approximation to reality. – Adele Goldberg

The Computer History Museum (CHM) houses a collection of Goldberg's working documents, reports, publications and videotapes related to her work on the development of Smalltalk. In 2022, with Dan Ingalls, she was made a Fellow of the CHM for promoting and co-developing the Smalltalk programming environment and contributions advancing use of computers in education. In 2010, Goldberg was named one of the honorees of the Women In Technology International (WITI) hall of fame.

== Selected publications ==
- Kay, A.; Goldberg, A.; Learning Research Group at Xerox Palo Alto Research Center (1977). "Personal Dynamic mediar" (PDF). Computer. 10 (3): 31–41.
- Goldberg, Adele; Robson, David (May 1, 1983). Harrison, Michael A. (ed.). Smalltalk-80: The Language and Its Implementation. Boston: Addison-Wesley. ISBN 978-0201113716. (out of print; the blue book as known by Smalltalk people)
- Goldberg, Adele (December 1, 1983). Smalltalk-80: The Interactive Programming Environment. Boston: Addison-Wesley. ISBN 978-0201113723. (the orange book)
- Goldberg, Adele; Robson, David (June 1, 1989). Smalltalk-80: The Language. Boston: Addison-Wesley. ISBN 978-0201136883. (the purple book, a revision of the blue book).
