= Odyssey: Pepsi to Apple =

1987 autobiography of John Sculley

- Author: John Sculley, John A. Byrne
- Genre: Autobiography
- Publisher: Harper & Row
- Publication date: August 1987

Odyssey: Pepsi to Apple is an autobiography by John Sculley, former Apple CEO, and John A. Byrne in August 1987, published by Harper & Row. In Odyssey, Sculley describes his time as CEO of PepsiCo and Apple during the late 1970s and early 80s. The epilogue of the book is dedicated to describing the Knowledge Navigator, a concept of Sculley's.

== Reviews ==
- "Book Review: Odyssey - Pepsi To Apple, by John Sculley | Digitalian". ianrosenwach.com.
- Schoenberg, Robert J. (1987-11-29). "Third Wave Wipeout : ODYSSEY Pepsi to Apple . . . A Journey of Adventure, Ideas, and the Future by John Sculley with John A. Byrne (Harper & Row: $21.95; 560 pp.) : STEVE JOBS The Journey Is the Reward by Jeffrey S. Young (Scott Foresman: 18.95; 320 pp., illustrated)". Los Angeles Times. ISSN 0458-3035.
- PC Mag. Ziff Davis, Inc. 1988-01-26.
