= The Colony (video game) =

1988 video game

- Developer: David Alan Smith
- Publisher: Mindscape
- Designer: David Alan Smith
- Engine: FLY-BY Environment Simulator
- Platforms: Macintosh, MS-DOS, Amiga
- Release: Macintosh: August 1988; MS-DOS: December 1988; Amiga; 1990
- Genres: First-person shooter, adventure, puzzle
- Mode: Single-player

The Colony is a 1988 first-person shooter video game developed by David Alan Smith and published by Mindscape for the Macintosh. The original Macintosh release came in two versions: one in color and one with black-and-white graphics. The MS-DOS version, released the same year, was available in black and white only, while the 1990 Amiga version was in color.

Previous first-person perspective games of the era used precomputed views, such as The Sentinel, or fixed-perspective graphics, such as Phantom Slayer. The Colony was one of the first games of its kind to let the player move freely while rendering graphics in real time. It was also one of the first 3D games to let the player enter and exit a vehicle.

== Plot ==
The player takes the role of a marshal responding to a distress call from a research colony. After crash-landing on the planet, the marshal must repair their damaged ship, investigate the colony, and eventually discover and stop an alien race plotting to take over the universe.

== Development ==
Instead of a 360-degree circle, The Colony used 256 "pseudo-degrees" which allowed the game engine to rotate the player's perspective using only one byte of data. Bit-map graphics were drawn using MacPaint, while 2D images such as doors, letters, and the Apple logo were crafted using the game engine.

David Alan Smith completed the first scenes of The Colony with a C compiler ported to the Macintosh by Softworks. Those first scenes were developed on a Macintosh with only 128KB of RAM and a single floppy disk drive. Eventually, development tools were made available on the Macintosh, allowing Mr. Smith to complete his work using the Megamax C and Lightspeed C compilers—on a Macintosh upgraded to 512KB of RAM and a 20MB hard drive.

== Reception ==
Computer Gaming World commented favorably on the combination of both action and adventure elements, but noted the immense difficulty of the game. Amiga Format echoed this feeling by giving it a 51% score and complaining that "the graphics are sketchy and unrealistic and the gameplay is repetitive and frustrating". Macworld named it Best Adventure Game of the Year in 1988, however, and in 2000 listed it as one of The Top Ten Mac Gaming Thingies of the Last 1,000 Years. Orson Scott Card, who disliked The Colony, wrote in Compute! "How did this game ever become a "game of the year"? Only because it originally appeared on the game-poor Mac", with excellent graphics that accompanied "a very limited puzzle game that became so annoying and confining" that he and his son gave up. Card stated that the game arbitrarily punished players for exploring, giving as example immediately dying from picking up cigarettes.

== Legacy ==
On June 6, 2023, Smith released the source code for the MS-DOS, Macintosh and Amiga versions on GitHub under the Apache License 2.0. Writer Richard Moss cited it as an example of the inventiveness of the Macintosh development scene.
