= Reproductive biology =

Branch of biology studying reproduction

Reproductive biology includes both sexual and asexual reproduction.

Reproductive biology includes a wide number of fields:

- Reproductive systems
- Endocrinology
- Sexual development (Puberty)
- Sexual maturity
- Reproduction
- Fertility

== Human reproductive biology ==
=== Endocrinology ===
Human reproductive biology is primarily controlled through hormones, which send signals to the human reproductive structures to influence growth and maturation. These hormones are secreted by endocrine glands, and spread to different tissues in the human body. In humans, the pituitary gland synthesizes hormones used to control the activity of endocrine glands.

=== Reproductive systems ===
Internal and external organs are included in the reproductive system. There are two reproductive systems including the male and female, which contain different organs from one another. These systems work together in order to produce offspring.

==== Female reproductive system ====
The female reproductive system includes the structures involved in ovulation, fertilization, development of an embryo, and birth.

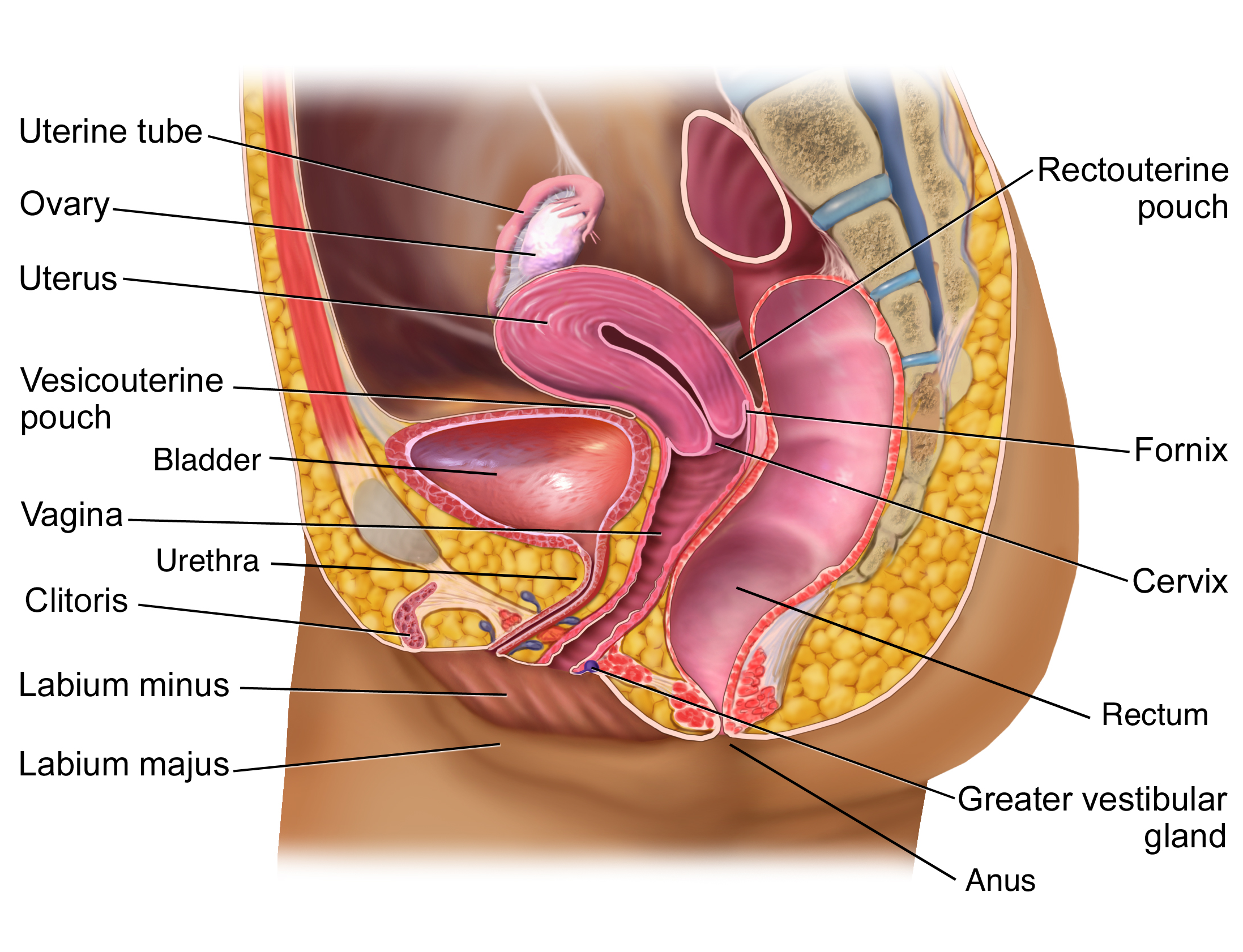
Human female reproductive structures.

These structures include:

- Ovaries
- Oviducts
- Uterus
- Vagina
- Mammary Glands

Estrogen is one of the sexual reproductive hormones that aid in the sexual reproductive system of the female.

==== Male reproductive system ====
The male reproductive system includes testes, rete testis, efferent ductules, epididymis, sex accessory glands, sex accessory ducts and external genitalia.

Testosterone, an androgen, although present in both males and females, is relatively more abundant in males. Testosterone serves as one of the major sexual reproductive hormones in the male reproductive system However, the enzyme aromatase is present in testes and capable of synthesizing estrogens from androgens. Estrogens are present in high concentrations in luminal fluids of the male reproductive tract. Androgen and estrogen receptors are abundant in epithelial cells of the male reproductive tract.

== Animal Reproductive Biology ==
Animal reproduction occurs by two modes of action, including both sexual and asexual reproduction. In asexual reproduction the generation of new organisms does not require the fusion sperm with an egg. However, in sexual reproduction new organisms are formed by the fusion of haploid sperm and eggs resulting in what is known as the zygote. Although animals exhibit both sexual and asexual reproduction the vast majority of animals reproduce by sexual reproduction.

In many species, relatively little is known about the conditions needed for successful breeding. Such information may be critical to preventing widespread extinction as species are increasingly affected by climate change and other threats. In the case of some species of frogs, such as the Mallorcan midwife toad and the Kihansi spray toad, it has been possible to repopulate areas where wild populations had been lost.

== Gametogenesis ==
Gametogenesis is the formation of gametes, or reproductive cells.

=== Spermatogenesis ===
Spermatogenesis is the production of sperm cells in the testis. In mature testes primordial germ cells divide mitotically to form the spermatogonia, which in turn generate spermatocytes by mitosis. Then each spermatocyte gives rise to four spermatids through meiosis. Spermatids are now haploid and undergo differentiation into sperm cells. Later in reproduction the sperm will fuse with a female oocyte to form the zygote.

=== Oogenesis ===
Oogenesis is the formation of a cell who will produce one ovum and three polar bodies. Oogenesis begins in the female embryo with the production of oogonia from primordial germ cells. Like spermatogenesis, the primordial germ cell undergo mitotic division to form the cells that will later undergo meiosis, but will be halted at the prophase I stage. This is known as the primary oocyte. Human females are born with all the primary oocytes they will ever have. Starting at puberty the process of meiosis can complete resulting in the secondary oocyte and the first polar body. The secondary oocyte can later be fertilized with the male sperm.

== Adaptive benefits of sexual reproduction ==
Sexual reproduction provides two principal adaptive benefits in contrast to asexual reproduction. These are genetic recombination and outcrossing. Genetic recombination during meiosis provides the benefit of recombinational repair of damage in the germline DNA passed on to progeny. Outcrossing provides the benefit of genetic complementation, that is, the masking of expression of deleterious recessive alleles in progeny (see heterosis, hybrid vigor). Genetic variation among progeny produced as a byproduct of sexual reproduction may also have adaptive consequences by providing infrequent beneficial variants that contribute to long-term evolutionary success.

== Bibliography ==
- Lombardi, Julian (1998). Comparative Vertebrate Reproduction. Kluwer Academic Publishers, Boston. link.
