= Hugh Dubberly =

- Education: Rhode Island School of Design (BFA, 1981); Yale University (MFA, 1983)
- Occupations: Designer, design theorist, educator
- Known for: Co-creator of Knowledge Navigator; Design theory and systems thinking
- Website: dubberly.com

Hugh Dubberly is an American designer, design theorist, and educator known for his work in interaction design, systems thinking, and design education. He held leadership positions at Apple Computer and Netscape, founded the design consultancy Dubberly Design Office, and has taught courses at universities. He was inducted into the CHI Academy in 2012 and named an AIGA Fellow in 2018.

== Education and early career ==
Dubberly earned a Bachelor of Fine Arts in Graphic Design from the Rhode Island School of Design in 1981 and a Master of Fine Arts in Graphic Design from Yale University in 1983. Following graduate school, he worked as design director at Wang Laboratories.

== Career ==
=== Apple Computer (1986–1994) ===
Dubberly joined Apple Computer in 1986 as Creative Director, managing graphic design and corporate identity. He co-created the Knowledge Navigator (1987), a technology-forecast video depicting a tablet computer with voice assistant and touchscreen interface. During his tenure at Apple, Dubberly also served as founding chairman of the Computer Graphics Department at Art Center College of Design.

=== Netscape (1995–2000) ===
After a brief period as Director of Interface Design at Times Mirror Company, Dubberly joined Netscape as Vice President of Design in 1995. At Netscape, he managed teams responsible for the company's web presence and portal development during the early commercial Internet era.

=== Dubberly Design Office (2000–present) ===
In 2000, Dubberly founded Dubberly Design Office in San Francisco, a consultancy focusing on interaction design, information design, and systems design.

== Selected publications ==
- "How do you design? A Compendium of Models" (2004, ongoing) – a collection of design process models
- "Why Horst W. J. Rittel Matters" (2007, with Chanpory Rith) – appeared in Design Issues (MIT Press)
- "Rethinking Design Education" (2023, with Meredith Davis) – appeared in She Ji: The Journal of Design, Economics, and Innovation

== Design theory contributions ==
Dubberly's theoretical work focuses on applying systems thinking and cybernetics to design practice. His central focus is on making complex ideas visible and understandable through models and diagrams. He has advocated that model-building should be a core competency for designers, arguing that explicit, visible models help teams share knowledge and improve products.

== Awards and recognition ==
- CHI Academy inductee (2012)
- AIGA Fellow (2018)
