= Bruce Tognazzini =

American businessman (born 1945)

Bruce "Tog" Tognazzini
- Born: Bruce Tognazzini; 1945 (age 80–81); California, United States
- Occupations: Principal, Nielsen Norman Group
- Spouse(s): Julie F. Moran, MD (1986–present)

Bruce "Tog" Tognazzini (born 1945) is an American usability and human-computer interaction professional. He is a partner in the Nielsen Norman Group. He was an early employee of Apple Computer, staying with the company for fourteen years, then he was with Sun Microsystems for four years, then WebMD for another four years.

Tognazzini has written two books, Tog on Interface and Tog on Software Design, published by Addison-Wesley, and he publishes the webzine Asktog, with the tagline "Interaction Design Solutions for the Real World".

== Career ==
Tog was an early employee of Apple Computer starting in 1978. In June 1978, Steve Jobs, having seen one of Tog's early programs, The Great American Probability Machine, had Jef Raskin hire him as Apple's first applications software engineer. He's listed on the back of his book Tog on Interface (Addison Wesley, 1991) as "Apple Employee #66" (the same employee number he held later at WebMD).

In his early days at Apple, simultaneous with his developing Apple's first human interface, for the Apple II computer, he published Super Hi-Res Chess, a novelty program for the Apple II that, despite its name, did not play chess or have any hi-res (high-resolution) graphics; instead, it seemed to crash to the Applesoft BASIC prompt with an error message, but was actually a parody of Apple's BASIC command line interface that seemingly took over control of one's computer, refusing to give it back until the magic word was discovered.

His work in user-interface testing and design, including publishing the first edition, in September, 1978, and seven subsequent editions of The Apple Human Interface Guidelines, played an important role in the direction of Apple's product line from the early days of Apple into the 1990s.

He and his partner, John David Eisenberg, wrote Apple Presents...Apple, the disk that taught new Apple II owners how to use the computer.

While working at Sun Microsystems, in 1992 and 1993, he produced the Starfire video prototype, in order to give an idea of a usability centered vision of the Office of the future. The video predicted the rise of a new technology that would become known as the World Wide Web. Popular Science Magazine reported, in March 2009, that Microsoft had just produced a new video showing life in the year 2019: "The 2019 Microsoft details with this video is almost identical to the 2004 predicted in this video produced by Sun Microsystems in 1992."

While at Sun Microsystems, Tog also filed for 58 US patents, with 57 issued in the areas of aviation safety, GPS, and human-computer interaction. Among them is US Patent 6278660, the time-zone-tracking wristwatch with built-in GPS and simple time-zone maps that sets itself using the GPS satellite's atomic clock and re-sets itself automatically whenever crossing into a new time zone.

In 2000, after his four-year stint at WebMD, Tog joined his colleagues as the third principal at the Nielsen Norman Group, along with Jakob Nielsen and Don Norman.

== Bibliography ==
- The Apple Human Interface Guidelines (1987) ISBN 0-201-17753-6 (uncredited, author is Apple Computer, Inc)
- Tog on Interface (1992) ISBN 0-201-60842-1
- Tog on Software Design (1995) ISBN 0-201-48917-1
