= Flex (programming language) =

In computing, the FLEX language was developed by Alan Kay in the late 1960s while exploring ideas that would later evolve into the Smalltalk programming language.
