= Paperless office =

Office that uses digital files/documents and devices instead of paper

A paperless office (or paper-free office or paper-light office) is a work environment in which the use of paper is eliminated or greatly reduced. This is done by converting documents and other papers into digital form, a process known as digitization. Proponents claim that "going paperless" can save money, boost productivity, save space, make documentation and information sharing easier, keep personal information more secure, and help the environment. The concept can be extended to communications outside the office as well.

== Definition and history ==
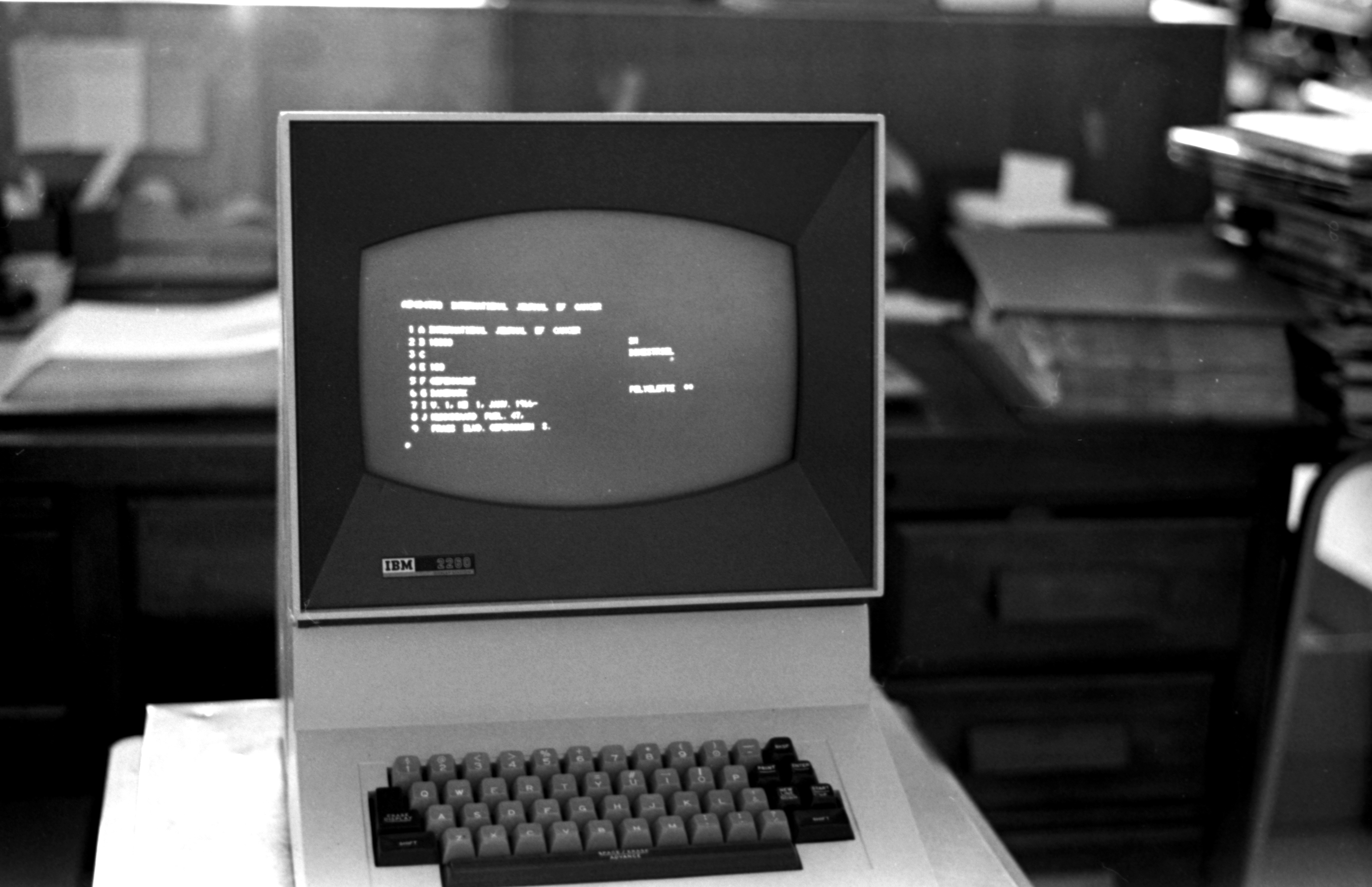
The IBM 2260

The paperless world was a publicist's slogan, intended to describe the office of the future. It was facilitated by the popularization of video display computer terminals like the 1964 IBM 2260. An early prediction of the paperless office was made in a 1975 Business Week article. The idea was that office automation would make paper redundant for routine tasks such as record-keeping and bookkeeping, and it came to prominence with the introduction of the personal computer. While the prediction of a PC on every desk was remarkably prophetic, the "paperless office" was not.

In 1983, Micronet, Inc. attempted to trademark the phrase "The Paperless Office", but abandoned this application in 1984.

In 2019, an analyst in New Zealand suggested that a more appropriate goal for an office may be to become "paper-light" rather than "paperless".

In 2022, the CEO of Foxit marketed its firm's vision of the "paperless office" as having economic as well as sustainability advantages.

According to one estimate, the worldwide use of office paper more than doubled from 1980 to 2000. This was attributed to the increased ease of document production and widespread use of electronic communication, which resulted in users receiving large numbers of printed documents.

In 2014, an analyst in the USA asserted that "we are actually accelerating in our use of paper with the annual growth rate of the amount of paper produced by the average company standing at 25%. Each day, an estimated 1 billion photocopies are made."

In 2024, the US EPA estimated that the "average American uses more than 700 pounds of paper every year - the highest paper usage figure per capita worldwide. In the last 20 years, the usage of paper products in the U.S. reached 208 million tons (up from 92 million), which is a growth of 126%."

Some argue that paper will always have a place because it affords different uses than screens, for example by being more reliably accessible.

== Environmental impact of paper ==
In the USA, over the 2005–2020 period, Scope 1 and 2 greenhouse gas emissions from each ton of production of "paper and wood products" decreased by 24.1%. Significant additional improvements in the carbon-intensity of the paper and wood products industry are envisaged by 2030.

In 2024, the US EPA asserted that "There are environmental and public health impacts of paper usage. The pulp and paper industry is the fifth largest consumer of energy, accounting for 4% of all the world’s energy use. The share of the paper in municipal solid waste by weight is 35%."

In 2003, the International Institute for Environment and Development noted that "There are two radically opposing views on [paper] consumption. In general, business argues that paper use can be made environmentally efficient and there should be no limits set on its consumption. Environmental and social groups, on the other hand, argue that such ecoefficiency can be helpful but this will not be sufficient to answer some of the moral demands for limited exploitation of the world’s natural resources."

== Environmental impact of electronics ==
A paperless work environment requires an infrastructure of electronic components to enable the production, transmission, and storage of information. The industry that produces these components is one of the least sustainable and most environmentally damaging sectors in the world. The process of manufacturing electronic hardware involves the extraction of precious metals and the production of plastic on an industrial scale. The transmission and storage of digital data is facilitated by data centers, which consume significant amounts of the electricity supply of a host country.

== Eliminating paper via automation and electronic forms automation ==
The need for paper is eliminated by using online systems, such as replacing index cards and rolodexes with databases, typed letters and faxes with email, and reference books with the internet. The E-Sign Act of 2000 in the United States provided that a document cannot be rejected on the basis of an electronic signature and required all companies to accept digital signatures on documents. Many document management systems include the ability to read documents via optical character recognition and use that data within the document management system's framework. While this technology is essential to achieving a paperless office it does not address the processes that generate paper in the first place.

== Securing and tracing documents ==
As awareness of identity theft and data breaches became more widespread, new laws and regulations were enacted, requiring companies that manage or store personally identifiable information to take proper care of those documents. Some have argued that paperless office systems are easier to secure than traditional filing cabinets, because individual accesses to each document can be tracked.

== Archival storage ==
See Digital preservation for a discussion of the issues in archival storage of digitized records.

== See also ==
- U.S. Paperwork Reduction Act (1980)
- Backup
- Sustainable business
- Economics of digitization
