= Croquet Project =

Former software project

Croquet
- Original authors: Alan Kay, Julian Lombardi, Mark P. McCahill, Andreas Raab, David P. Reed, David A. Smith
- Release: 2004; 22 years ago
- Final release: 1.0 / December 24, 2009; 16 years ago
- Written in: Squeak Smalltalk
- Operating system: Unix-like, macOS; Windows
- Platform: Squeak
- Available in: English
- Type: Multiuser virtual environment
- License: MIT
- Website: croquet.io

The Croquet Project is a software project that was intended to promote the continued development of the Croquet open-source software development kit to create and deliver collaborative multi-user online applications. Croquet is implemented in Squeak Smalltalk.

Croquet supports communication, collaboration, resource sharing, and synchronous computation among multiple users.

Applications created with the Croquet software development kit can be used to support collaborative data visualization, virtual learning and problem solving environments, 3D wikis, online gaming environments (massively multiplayer online role-playing games (MMORPGs)), and privately maintained or interconnected multiuser virtual environments.

Further development of the technology has also branched into the Open Cobalt and Open Croquet efforts.

The most recent iteration of Croquet is a commercial product developed by Croquet Labs. This version of Croquet runs in a web browser and allows programs to be written in JavaScript or WebAssembly.

== Technical functions ==
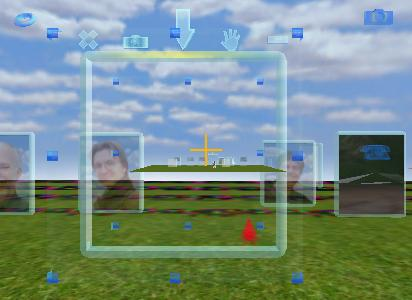
Real time, interactive, 3D map of this very same world. Change something in the world, the map changes. Move something in the map (as one would a chess piece), the object in the world represented by it moves the same way.

Croquet is a software development kit (SDK) for use in developing collaborative virtual world applications.

Applications created using the Croquet SDK are automatically collaborative since application objects in Croquet share a common protocol allowing them to cooperate with each other by employing the principle of replicated computation (synchronization) together with a peer-based messaging protocol. The technology is designed to facilitate such replication between peers, to greatly reduce the overhead needed for widespread deployment of collaborative virtual worlds.

This efficiency, combined with the ability to deploy Croquet-based virtual worlds on consumer-level hardware, makes it possible for developers to deploy large-scale and highly participatory collaborative worlds at very low cost compared with virtual world technologies that are entirely dependent on server-based infrastructures to support the activities of their users.

== Architecture ==
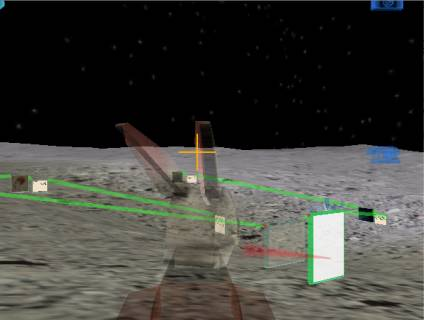
Adding 3D Notes linked to 3D objects and places

=== Virtual machines ===
Croquet's virtual machine (VM) runs bit identically on multiple platforms, and supports multiple abilities that could only be provided by a true late bound, message sending language.

Croquet's relationship to Squeak gives Croquet the property of a purely object-oriented system allowing for significant flexibility in the design and the nature of the protocols and architectures that have been developed for the system.

Because of this, Croquet has the ability to keep running while code is modified and tested, while changes are made, an essential part of the Croquet collaborative development ability. Users can change the code running the environment while the environment runs.

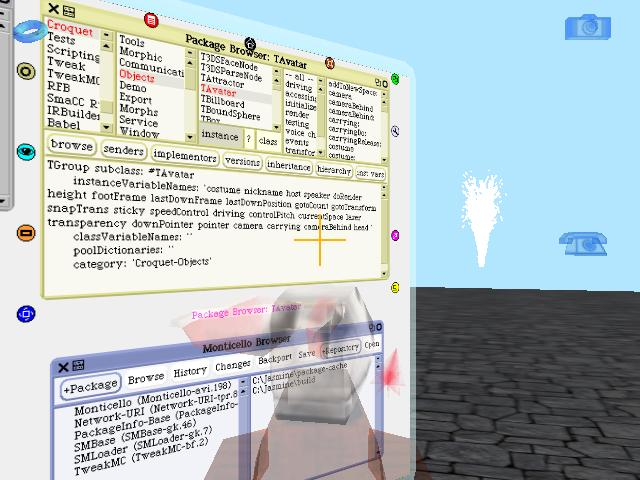
Croquet allows users to edit the source code of the 3D world from within the world, and immediately see the result, while the world is still running. The running program does not need to be ended, and there is no compile-link-run-debug development loop. Any part of the program may be edited, down to the VM and OpenGL calls.

=== Synchronization architecture ===
Croquet's time-based synchronization abilities enable real-time, identical interactions between groups of users while dramatically reducing the need for server infrastructures to support virtual world deployment. Croquet's architecture is designed to make it easy to develop deeply collaborative applications without having to spend a lot of effort and expertise in understanding how replicated applications work.

TeaTime is a scalable real-time multi-user architecture that is the basis for Croquet's object-object communication and synchronization. It is designed to support multi-user applications that can be scaled to massive numbers of concurrently interacting users in a shared virtual space. The most directly visible part of this architecture is the TObject class which is used to define and construct subclassed Tea objects. All of the interesting objects inside of Croquet are constructed from subclasses of TObject.

A Tea object acts with the property that messages sent to it are redirected to replicated copies of itself on other users' participating machines in a peer-to-peer network. This messaging protocol supports a coordinated distributed two-phase commit that is used to control the progression of computations at participating user sites. In this way messages may be dynamically redirected to large numbers of users while maintaining the appropriate deadline-based scheduling. Thus, TeaTime is designed to allow for a great deal of adaptability and resilience and works on a heterogeneous set of resources. It is a framework of abstraction that works over a range of implementations and that can be evolved and tuned over time, both within an application and across applications.

Key elements of the TeaTime synchronization architecture include:

- A coordinated universal timebase embedded in communication protocol
- Replicated, versioned objects that unify replicated computation and distribution of results
- Replication strategies that separate the mechanisms of replication from the behavioral semantics of objects
- Deadline-based scheduling extended with failure and nesting
- Coordinated, distributed two-phase commit that is used to control the progress of computations at multiple sites, to provide resilience, deterministic results, and adaptation to available resources
- Uses distributed sets

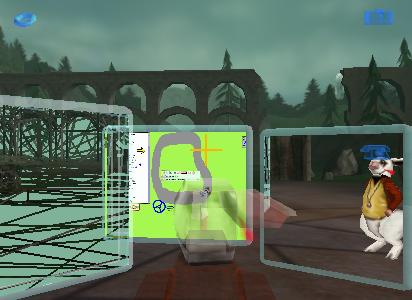
Croquet avatar with wireframe portal, eToy, and mirror

== Immersive Terf ==
The original authors of Croquet opened a commercial company named Qwaq which was later renamed to Teleplace. That technology was later sold back to a group of the original Croquet developers and became Immersive Terf.

== History ==
Croquet is the confluence of several independent lines of work that were being carried out by its six principal architects, Alan Kay, David A. Smith. David P. Reed, Andreas Raab, Julian Lombardi, and Mark McCahill. The present identity of the project has its origins in a conversation between Smith and Kay in 1990, where both expressed their frustration with the state of operating systems at the time.

In 1994, Smith built ICE, a working prototype of a two user collaborative system that was a predecessor of the core of what Croquet is today. Also in 1994, Mark McCahill's team at the University of Minnesota developed GopherVR, a 3D user interface to Internet Gopher to explore how spatial metaphors could be used to organize information and create social spaces. In 1996, Julian Lombardi approached Smith to explore the development of highly extensible collaborative interfaces to the World Wide Web. Later, in 1999, Smith built a system called OpenSpace, which was an early-bound variant of Croquet. Also in 1999, Lombardi began working with Smith on prototype implementations of highly extensible collaborative online environments based on OpenSpace. One of these implementations was a prototype implementation of ViOS, a way to spatially organize all Internet-deliverable resources (including web pages) into a massively-scaled multiuser 3D environment.

Smith and Kay officially started the Croquet Project in late 2001, and were immediately joined by David Reed and Andreas Raab. Reed brought to the project his longstanding work on massively scalable peer-to-peer messaging architectures in a form deriving from his doctoral dissertation that was published in 1978. The first working Croquet code was developed in January 2002. Simultaneously and independently, Lombardi and McCahill began collaborating on defining and implementing highly scalable and enterprise-integrated architectures for multi-user collaboration and were invited by Kay to join the core architectural group in 2003.

From 2003 to 2006, the technology was developed under the leadership of its six principal architects with financial support from Hewlett-Packard, Viewpoints Research Institute Inc., the University of Wisconsin–Madison, University of Minnesota, Japanese National Institute of Communication Technology (NICT), and private individuals. On April 18, 2006, the project released a beta version of the Croquet Software development kit 1.0 in the open-source. Since then, the Croquet technology infrastructure has been successfully used by private industry to build and to deploy commercial-grade closed source collaborative applications. Open source production-grade software implementations for delivering secure, interactive, persistent, virtual workspaces for education and training have at the same time been developed and deployed at the University of Minnesota, University of Wisconsin–Madison, University of British Columbia, and Duke University.

As of 2009, continued development of the original Croquet technology has also taken place through the Open Cobalt and Open Croquet projects.

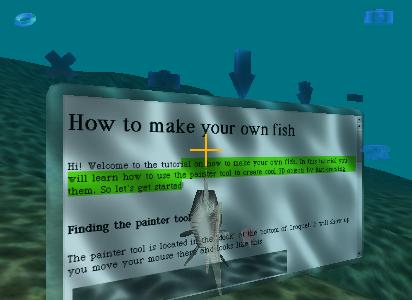
Multi-user, multi-lingual text editing in 3D

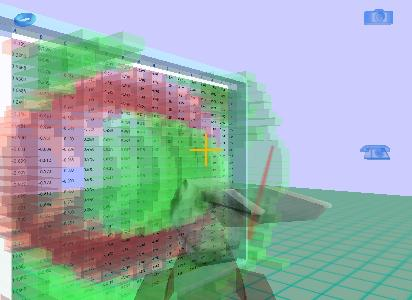
Croquet Spreadsheet

== Unique aspects ==
- It is platform and device independent
- Users and developers may freely share, modify and view the source code of the whole system, due to a liberal license
- The technology is not hosted on one organization's server, and hence not governed by any such organization
- It provides a complete professional programmer's language (Squeak Smalltalk), integrated development environment (IDE), and class library in every distributed, running participant's copy; the programming development environment itself is simultaneously shareable and extensible
- Croquet based worlds can also be updated while the system is live and running

== See also ==
- Open Cobalt, a sister project of Croquet also written in Squeak Smalltalk
- Open Wonderland, a Java-based open source 3D toolkit to create collaborative virtual worlds
