= Starfire (film) =

Futuristic promotional video

Starfire was a Sun Microsystems promotional video filmed in 1994, demonstrating Bruce Tognazzini's ideas for a 21st-century computer user interface. Inspired in part by Apple Computer's Knowledge Navigator film from 1987, Tognazzini and his team at SunSoft sought to create a more realistic look at how computer technology and interfaces would improve. The project drew together the talents of more than 100 engineers, designers, futurists, and filmmakers in an effort to both predict and guide the future of computing.

The film is set in the year 2004 and features a protagonist interacting by voice, mouse, and stylus with a 5-foot-wide computer screen (1.5 m) . The story concerns an executive at an auto-maker who must make a compelling presentation for her design.

In the video's boardroom scene, it predicts the rise of a new technology similar to what is now known as the World Wide Web.

Popular Science Magazine reported, in March 2009, that Microsoft had just produced a new video showing life in the year 2019: "The 2019 Microsoft details with this video is almost identical to the 2004 predicted in this video produced by Sun Microsystems in 1992."

In addition to the film, the project also produced:

- Tog on Software Design, which not only covers the film in intimate detail, but lays out several more equally thought-provoking scenarios, even if they were not enshrined in celluloid.
- Starfire, the Paper, published in the CHI Proceedings, outlining the rules followed in attempting to build a scientifically legitimate video prototype, as opposed to simply confabulating a fanciful, but non-implementable, vision.

The film was released as the Starfire video, in NTSC format, and later made available as part of a collection of human-computer interaction videos.

== Similar ==
- Corning's 2011 A Day Made of Glass promotional video has similar elements
