= Open Cobalt =

Software for creating virtual worlds

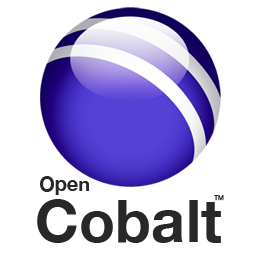
- Developers: Community source and Duke University
- Release: 2009
- Written in: Squeak Smalltalk
- Operating system: Linux, macOS, Windows
- Available in: English
- Type: 3D Browser, Virtual world, 3D computer graphics
- License: MIT
- Website: www.opencobalt.net

Open Cobalt is a free and open-source software platform for constructing, accessing, and sharing virtual worlds both on local area networks or across the Internet, with no need for centralized servers.

The technology is designed to make it easy to create deeply collaborative and hyperlinked multi-user virtual workspaces, virtual exhibit spaces, and game-based learning and training environments that run on all major software operating systems. By using a peer-to-peer-based message passing protocol to reduce reliance on server infrastructures for support of basic in-world interactions across many participants, Open Cobalt also includes the functionality for people to hyperlink their virtual worlds via 3D portals to form a large distributed network of interconnected collaboration spaces. It also allows for schools and other organizations to freely set up their own networks of public and private 3D virtual workspaces that feature integrated web browsing, voice chat, text chat, and access to remote desktop applications and services.

Open Cobalt uses the Squeak software environment, which is an open-source Smalltalk system freely available for macOS, Unix, and Windows. As is true of almost any Smalltalk application, Open Cobalt has identical functioning on any supported platform. As a Smalltalk system, it can usually be updated while the system is running without needing a restart.

== Expected uses ==
Open Cobalt is designed to enable the deployment of secure virtual world spaces that support education, research, and the activities of virtual organizations. By leveraging OpenGL-based 3D graphics, Open Cobalt supports highly scalable collaborative data visualization, virtual learning and problem solving environments, 3D wikis, online gaming environments termed Massively multiplayer online role-playing games (MMORPGs), and privately and securely maintained multi-user virtual environments.

== History ==
Open Cobalt user interface and avatar-enabled virtual environment containing .kmz mesh content imported from Google's 3D Warehouse. Users are able to provision content to Open Cobalt spaces that can be developed and managed using third-party tools and resources.

Open Cobalt is derived from the Croquet software development kit (SDK) that was publicly released under the MIT License by Hewlett-Packard and the Croquet Consortium in early 2007.

In early 2008, and with the support of the Andrew W. Mellon Foundation, Julian Lombardi and Mark P. McCahill, at Duke University, launched the community-based software development effort to build Open Cobalt as an open-source virtual world browser application and construction toolkit.

In May 2008, Lombardi was awarded a National Science Foundation grant to further strengthen the community-based software development effort and bring the Open Cobalt virtual world browser to its alpha release.

Together with John Dougan as technical project lead and a growing international community of software developers and volunteers, the Open Cobalt project contributors released Open Cobalt Alpha in April 2010.

OpenCobalt 1.0 alpha 22 was released in June 2015. Recent activity involving the project can be found in the Open Cobalt Google Group.

== Goals ==
The goals of the Open Cobalt effort are to stimulate the use of distributed virtual environments, advance visual simulations, and deepen collaboration in education, research, and personal entertainment - and in so doing to:

1. stimulate the development and dissemination of shared cyberenvironments for the staging, observation and evaluation of collaborative decision-making, problem finding, and problem solving among members of distributed virtual organizations and educational communities, and
2. create the conditions for the emergence of a free, open, and scalable 3D-enabled global information space.

== Features ==
Open Cobalt is both an end-user application and full featured software development environment for creating a large network of end-user created interlinked virtual worlds. It is more extensible than the technologies behind collaborative worlds such as Second Life, and ViOS. This is because:

- It is free (there are no fees for its use or distribution)
- The entire system is open-source (it is licensed under the MIT free software license)
- It does not need the use of servers to create and share virtual worlds (since it is based on a peer-to-peer synchronization architecture/messaging protocol)
- It is platform and device independent (because it is a virtual machine-based technology that runs on Linux, macOS, and Windows)
- It provides a complete professional programmer's language (Smalltalk/Squeak, IDE, and class library in every distributed, running participant's copy (with the programming environment itself being simultaneously shareable and extensible)
- It is based on Squeak's late-binding architecture and metaprogramming facilities (that allow for efficient handling of media)
- Users/developers within virtual worlds may freely access, modify and view the source code of the entire system (they can access running code from in-world)
- Users/developers can import 3D content directly into their worlds (Google 3D Warehouse content (.kmz) and content in other formats can be drag-and-dropped directly into Open Cobalt worlds)
- Users/developers can import a variety of media content directly into their worlds (Open Cobalt worlds support audio and mpeg media content)
- Its software code can be updated/changed while the system is live (making it possible to program worlds from within worlds while they are running)
- It is not hosted on a single organization's server (and hence not governed by any such organization)

=== 3D hyperlinking ===
Open Cobalt 3D hyperlinks connecting five different virtual spaces. Three-dimensional hyperlinks appear as navigable portals and enable Open Cobalt worlds to be organized by end-users into an interlinked network of virtual spaces across local and wide area networks.

Unlike most other virtual world platforms (with the exception of OpenSimulator's Hypergrid architecture), Open Cobalt uses a method of hyperlinking, known as "space-linking", which resembles a window frame or portal and, when revolved, shows a 360-degree real-time view of one region to a user in another region; such portals can also be walked through by users. Space-linking is an alternative to teleportation, a more common means of traversing between regions or spaces, and is also a primary means of travelling between whole grids.

Like MediaWiki's redlinks, such portals are also used to link to uncreated spaces or regions (colored in black) in order to indicate the need to create newer spaces.

=== Remote collaboration ===
Two users' avatars accessing a single VNC session within a secure and collaborative Open Cobalt space. Integration of VNC with Open Cobalt makes it possible for users to collaboratively access the desktops and applications running on remote machines anywhere on the network.

- Enterprise directory access; Lightweight Directory Access Protocol (LDAP)
- Works over local area networks (LAN) and within Intranets
- Integrated text chat; Extensible Messaging and Presence Protocol (XMPP)
- In-world voice chat; Voice over IP (VoIP)
- In-world video chat
- In-world web browsing; via Virtual Network Computing (VNC)
- In-world annotations (text and audio)
- Collaborative document sharing/editing

=== Filetype support ===
- Mesh and texture import (.kmz, .obj, .ase, .vrml)
- Media import (.mpg)
- Scripting (Smalltalk/Squeak)
- Custom avatars/animation (via Collada/Ogre 3D workflows)
- OpenGL-based graphics engine
- OpenAL

== Technical functions ==
Open Cobalt is an application built using the Open Croquet software developer's toolkit. Its relationship to Open Croquet provides it with a number of powerful capabilities.

=== Programming environment ===
Open Cobalt's software development environment enables programmers to enjoy the capabilities of a true late bound, message sending language. Because it is built on Squeak/Croquet, Open Cobalt is a purely object-oriented programming system that allows for significant flexibility in its design and implementation.

Within Open Cobalt, programmers may edit the source code of the 3D world from within the world, and immediately see the result while the world is still running. The running program does not have to be ended, and there is no compile-link-run-debug development loop. Any part of the program may be edited, down to the virtual machine (VM) and OpenGL calls. Open Cobalt's reliance on Squeak's generalized storage allocator and garbage collector makes it highly efficient in real-time and allows reshaping of objects to be done safely.

As with Squeak, Open Cobalt supports many non-English languages and fonts such as German, Spanish, French, and Japanese.

=== Synchronization architecture ===
Open Cobalt's programming environment. A complete professional programmer's language (Smalltalk/Squeak), IDE, and class library is present in every distributed, running participant's copy.

Underlying Open Cobalt is an object-oriented semantics based on active objects that have the capability of temporal reflection.

Each object is aware of, and in direct control, of its behavior in time. Open Cobalt also directly supports replication of computation, allowing computation to be moved close to the point of interaction on demand, while maintaining a consistent view of behaviors that can scale to include thousands of nodes. It does this by using a combination of object semantics along with a modified version of David P. Reed's TeaTime peer-based messaging protocol as a distributed message transactional system enabling replicated computation (synchronization) across multiple peers. This makes replicated computation as easily as replicating data - and makes synchronization of all events across multiple peers a fundamental property of the system.

Owing to these properties, software developers can use Open Cobalt as a way of creating deeply collaborative applications without the effort needed to understand how replicated applications work. This reduces the programming overhead needed for widespread deployment of deeply capable collaborative virtual spaces. It also makes it possible to deploy and coordinate the activities of virtual worlds on multiple machines without the need to maintain central server resources (other than those needed for specialized data and institutional middleware services).

Open Cobalt's implementation of TeaTime includes:

1. A coordinated universal time-base embedded in the communication protocol,
2. Replicated, versioned objects that unify replicated computation and distribution of results,
3. Replication strategies that separate the mechanisms of replication from the behavioral semantics of objects,
4. Deadline-based scheduling extended with failure and nesting,
5. Coordinated, distributed two-phase commit that is used to control the progress of computations at multiple sites, to provide resilience, deterministic results, and adaptation to available resources,
6. Use of distributed sets.

== See also ==
- Croquet Project, a sister project also written in Squeak Smalltalk
