= GopherVR =

Graphical Gopher client

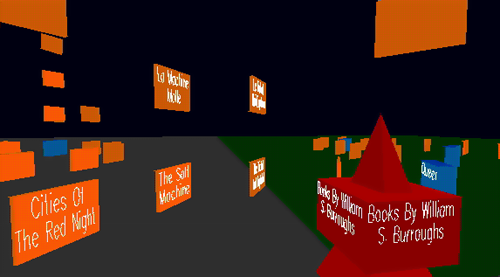
GopherVR displaying the major works of author William S. Burroughs

GopherVR is an enhanced Internet Gopher client that includes a 3D visualization tool for viewing resource collections as 3D scenes. It explored how people outside of formal research laboratories could use spatial metaphors to access information. The 3D view was intended to be similar to 3D games of the time, like Spectre. The authors were interested in how this spatial representation could address the "lost in hyperspace" feeling that people using conventional Gopher clients sometimes experienced.

In 1995, the Gopher developers at the University of Minnesota released GopherVR. Using Gopher+ protocol extensions, spatial positions for Gopher resources are specified, and GopherVR clients combine traditional Gopher hierarchy browsing with 3D scene navigation. It was primarily written by Mark P. McCahill, Paul Lindner and Neophytos Iacovou. This original version was available for Unix, using Motif and X11, and the classic Mac OS; although incomplete, they were offered as partially functional alpha versions for testing.

Godot was another GopherVR client. It used a Z39.50 interface to libraries, allowing you to navigate the contents of a library in 3D.

According to McCahill, GopherVR's goals included showing the potential of structures that "separate the organization from the content", so "you could display the organizational structure a bunch of different ways", which the Web did not have ways of handling at the time.

At the time GopherVR became available, the World Wide Web had recently been growing, and Gopher was already less commonly used.

== Revival ==
The software packages for GopherVR were stored on the UMN Boombox FTP server, and (probably due to a defective backup and restore) virtually all Gopher software on this server over 96k in length had become corrupted, resulting in the loss of all publicly available copies of the source code until it was rediscovered and made available by Mark McCahill in June 2008.

In December 2009, GopherVR was re-released by Cameron Kaiser in an updated form for Mac OS X, Linux and other platforms, but is still considered incomplete.
