= Nielsen Norman Group =

American research and UX design firm

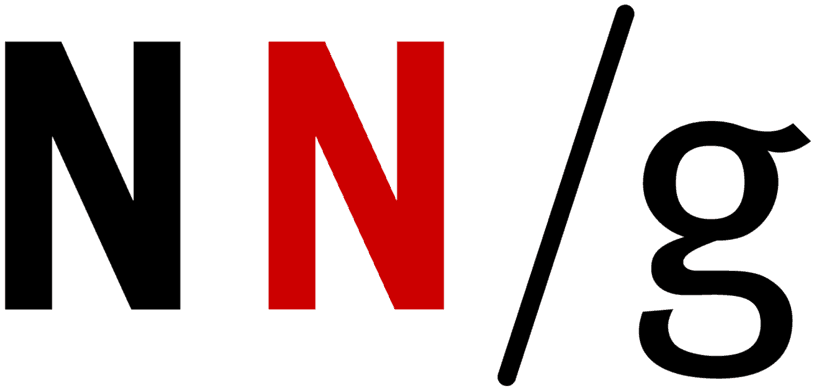
- Type: Private
- Industry: Interface design training; Technology consulting
- Founded: August 28, 1998; 27 years ago (incorporation)
- Founders: Jakob Nielsen; Don Norman
- Headquarters: Fremont, California, United States
- Key people: Kara Pernice (Current CEO)
- Number of employees: 52
- Website: www.nngroup.com

The Nielsen Norman Group (NN/G) is an American research and UX design firm providing training, consulting and research services.

The company was founded in Fremont, California, United States in 1998 by Jakob Nielsen and Don Norman. In 2000, Bruce Tognazzini joined the Nielsen Norman Group as a principal.

Jakob Nielsen retired from NN/G in March 2023. Kara Pernice, who joined the company in 2000, was appointed president and CEO on April 1, 2023. Don Norman remains a member of the company's board of directors.

The company's work includes eye-tracking research describing the F-shaped reading pattern and an analysis of the interface of Microsoft Windows 8. The group has also conducted analysis of user experience in AI interfaces, mobile devices, and intranets.
