= Dynabook =

Early portable computer concept

- The Dynabook's original illustration in Alan C. Kay's August 31, 1972 paper
- Developer: Alan Kay
- Released: Concept 1972

The KiddiComp concept, envisioned by Alan Kay on January 1, 1968 while a PhD candidate, and later developed and described as the Dynabook in his 1972 proposal "A personal computer for children of all ages", outlines the requirements for a conceptual portable educational device that would offer similar functionality to that now supplied via a laptop computer or (in some of its other incarnations) a tablet or slate computer with the exception of the requirement for any Dynabook device offering near eternal battery life. Adults could also use a Dynabook, but the target audience was children.

Though the hardware required to create a Dynabook is here today, Alan Kay still thinks the Dynabook hasn't been invented yet, because key software and educational curricula are missing. When Microsoft came up with its tablet PC in 2001, Kay was quoted as saying "Microsoft's Tablet PC, the first Dynabook-like computer good enough to criticize".

In 1989, Toshiba released a sub-notebook computer called DynaBook, inspired by the concept. Kay was personally gifted a unit and was a guest of Toshiba. The company released notebook computers under the DynaBook brand in Japan; in 2018, Sharp acquired a majority stake in Toshiba's PC business, now named Dynabook Inc. and has marketed notebooks worldwide under the Dynabook name.

== Original concept ==
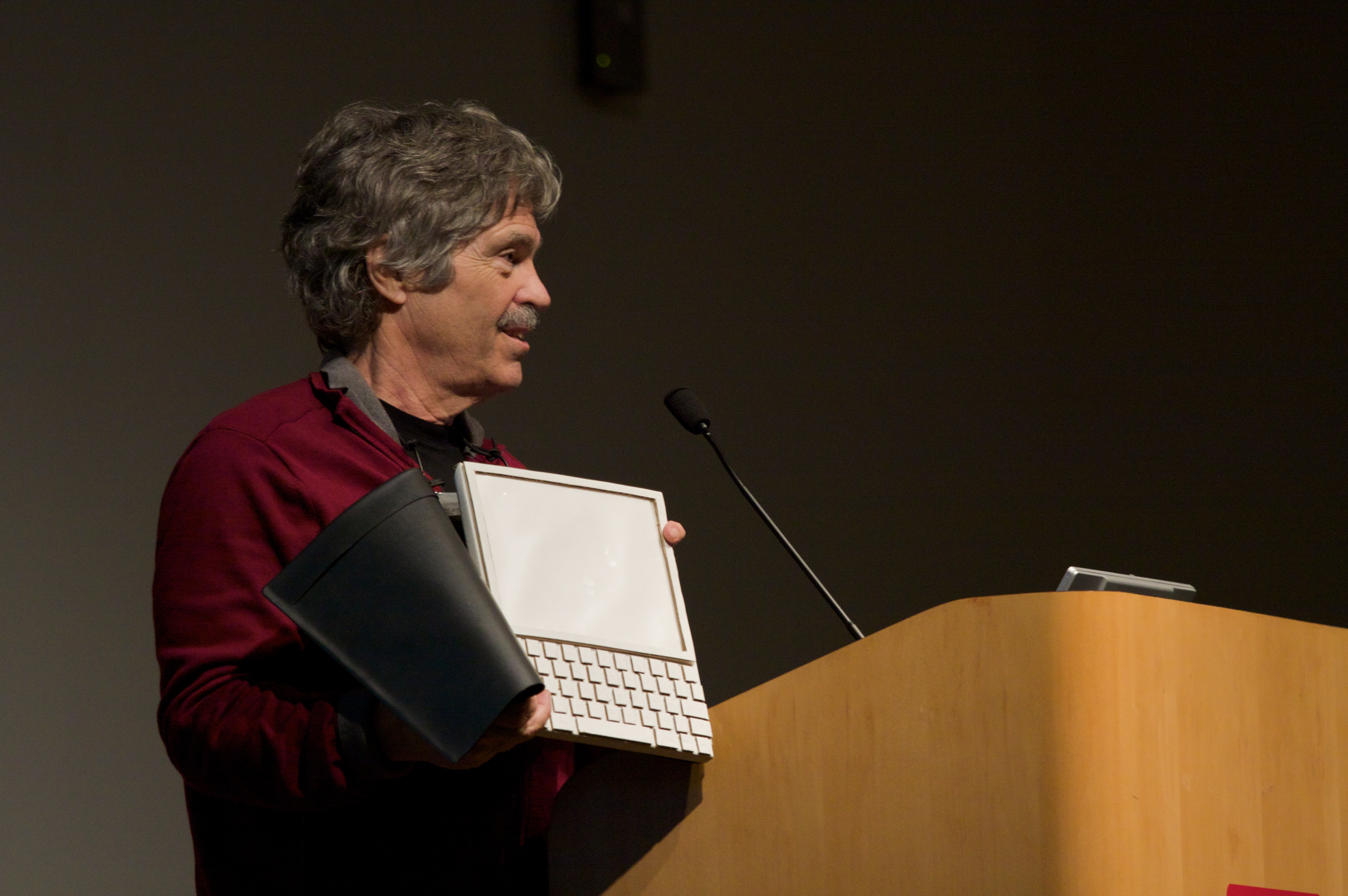
Alan Kay holding the mockup of Dynabook, 2008

Describing the idea as "A Personal Computer For Children of All Ages", Kay wanted the Dynabook concept to embody the learning theories of Jerome Bruner and some of what Seymour Papert— who had studied with developmental psychologist Jean Piaget and was one of the inventors of the Logo programming language — was proposing. This concept was created two years before the founding of Xerox PARC. The ideas led to the development of the Xerox Alto prototype, which was originally called "the interim Dynabook". It embodied all the elements of a graphical user interface, or GUI, as early as 1972. The software component of this research was Smalltalk, which went on to have a life of its own independent of the Dynabook concept.

The hardware on which the programming environment ran was relatively irrelevant.

At the same time, Kay tried in his 1972 article to identify existing hardware components that could be used in a Dynabook, including screens, processors and storage memory. For example:

A standalone 'smart terminal' that uses one of these chips for a processor (and includes memory, a keyboard, a display and two cassettes) is now on the market for about $6000.

The Dynabook vision was most fully laid out in Kay’s 1977 article "Personal Dynamic Media", co-authored with collaborator (and Smalltalk co-inventor) Adele Goldberg.

In 2019, Kay gave a detailed answer to a question on Quora, about the origins of the Dynabook concept.

== Later works ==
Since the late 1990s, Kay has been working on the Squeak programming system, an open source Smalltalk-based environment which could be seen as a logical continuation of the Dynabook concept.

He was actively involved in the One Laptop Per Child project, which uses Smalltalk, Squeak, and the concepts of a computer for learning.
