= Julian Lombardi =

American computer scientist

- Born: November 11, 1956 (age 69); United States
- Known for: ViOS, Croquet Project, Open Cobalt
- Scientific career
- Fields: Computer science, Biology
- Workplaces: Duke University

Julian Lombardi (born November 11, 1956) is an American inventor, author, educator, and computer scientist known for his work with socio-computational systems, scalable virtual world technologies, and in the design and deployment of deeply collaborative virtual learning environments.

== Biography ==
Lombardi was born to a concert pianist and an Italian actress living in New York City. His family soon moved back to Rome, Italy, where he lived until the age of six. He went on to attend Buckley Country Day School and public schools in Great Neck, New York and elsewhere on Long Island. In 1974 Lombardi began his undergraduate studies at Dowling College and graduated cum laude in the biology major and physics minor in 1977. He attended graduate school at Clemson University, where he received his MA in 1980 and was granted a PhD in zoology in 1983.

Upon graduation, Lombardi accepted a postdoctoral appointment and lectureship in the biological sciences at the University of North Carolina which he held until 1986. In 1986, Lombardi was appointed an assistant professor of biology at the University of North Carolina at Greensboro. In 1990, he received tenure and was named director of graduate studies in biology. He served on the faculty at the University of North Carolina at Greensboro until 1999. Lombardi also served as director of the university's Analytical Visualization Center from 1993 to 1999. From 2002 to 2005, Lombardi managed a research and development group at the University of Wisconsin–Madison that specialized in the design and development of open source virtual learning environments and digital media technologies for learning and instruction. Currently Lombardi is an assistant vice president with Duke University's Office of Information Technology. He is also a senior research scholar with Duke University's program in information science and information studies, and an adjunct professor with Duke University's Department of Computer Science.

== Work ==
Lombardi's early research program centered on the evolution of complex organismal function in vertebrates and the evolution of maternal-embryonic physiological relationships. An advocate of the use of imaging technologies and early adopter of information technology in university teaching and learning, in 1987 Lombardi began writing HyperTalk-based software applications in support of learning and instruction in anatomy and physiology. In the mid-1990s, Lombardi combined his interests in information technology, complex systems, and the phenomenon of emergence in biological systems to begin designing and developing computer-supported collaboration systems involving self-optimizing massively multiuser online 3D environments.

=== The Bone Box ===
In 1989 he developed and marketed The Bone Box, a commercial 3D auto-tutorial program for use in learning human skeletal anatomy with the early Macintosh computer.

=== ViOS ===
Lombardi eventually founded ViOS, Inc. where, during the period from 1999 to 2001, he served as the venture capital-backed company's first CEO and then chief creative officer/software architect. There, he and his team designed and implemented ViOS, a client–server technology that enabled the first 3D user interface to network deliverable resources (including the Internet) in the form of a highly customizable and massively multi-user online virtual environment – essentially a very large scale social software system/3D wiki.

=== Croquet Project ===
Lombardi is one of the six principal architects of the Croquet software developer's toolkit and from 2006 to 2008 he served as executive director of the Croquet Consortium, a not-for-profit organization to promote the adoption of Croquet open source software technologies.

=== Open Cobalt ===
Lombardi led a National Science Foundation funded effort to develop Open Cobalt, an open source and multi-platform metaverse browser and toolkit application and toolset to support the large scale visualization and simulation needs of educators and researchers. Open Cobalt is being made available in the open source as a way of fostering a viable community-based software development effort leading to open virtual world technologies supporting the needs of research and education.

== Publications ==
Books:

- 1998. Comparative Vertebrate Reproduction. Kluwer Academic Publishers, Boston Mass.

Selected papers and articles

- 2004. "Design for an extensible Croquet-based framework to deliver a persistent, unified, massively multi-user, and self-organizing virtual environment". With Mark P. McCahill. In: Proceedings of the Second Annual Conference on Creating, Connecting, and Collaborating through Computing. Edited by Y. Kambayashi, K. Tanaka, and K. Rose.
- 2005. "Annotation authoring in 3D collaborative virtual environments". With others. In: 15th International Conference on Artificial Reality and Telexistence (ICAT 2005).
- 2006. "3D model annotation from multiple viewpoints for Croquet". With others. In: Proceedings of the Fourth Annual Conference on Creating, Connecting, and Collaborating through Computing, Edited by K. Tanaka, and K. Rose. IEEE.
- 2010. "Opening the Metaverse". With Marilyn Lombardi. In: Online Worlds: Convergence of the Real and the Virtual. Edited by W. S. Bainbridge. Springer-Verlag, New York, NY. 318 pp.

Patents:

- Lombardi, J. 1999. U.S. patent 5,889,951 — Systems, methods, and computer program products for accessing, leasing, relocating, constructing and modifying internet sites within a multi-dimensional virtual reality environment
