= Mark P. McCahill =

American computer scientist (born 1956)

Mark P. McCahill (Mark Perry McCahill)
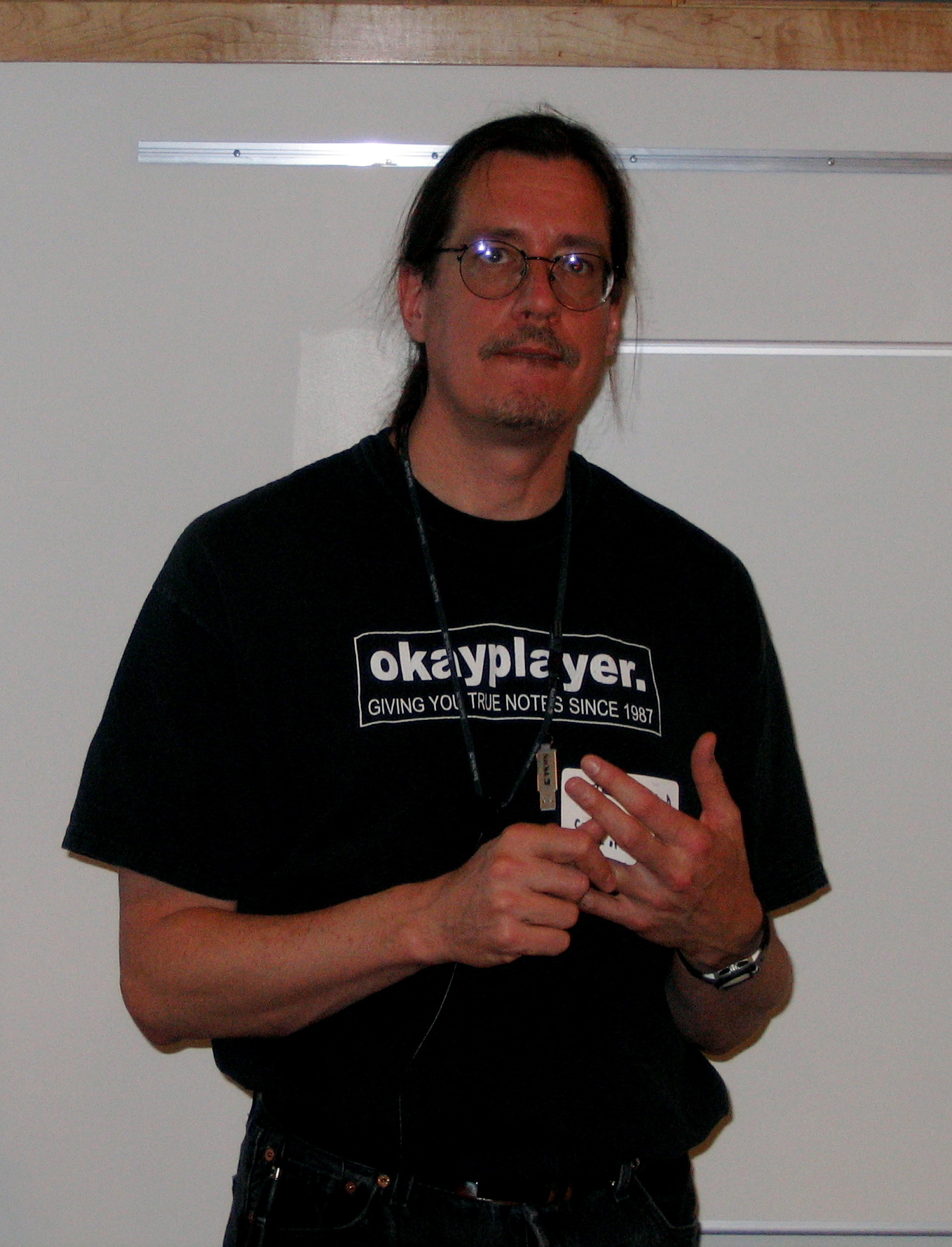
- Born: February 7, 1956 (age 70)
- Occupation: Programmer/systems architect
- Employers: University of Minnesota; Duke University
- Known for: Inventing the Gopher protocol, the predecessor of the World Wide Web; developing and popularizing a number of other Internet technologies

Mark Perry McCahill (born February 7, 1956) is an American computer scientist and Internet pioneer. He has developed and popularized a number of Internet technologies since the late 1980s, including the Gopher protocol, Uniform Resource Locators (URLs), and POPmail.

== Career ==
Mark McCahill received a Bachelor of Arts in chemistry at the University of Minnesota in 1979, spent one year doing analytical environmental chemistry, and then joined the University of Minnesota Computer Center as a programmer.

=== Internet pioneer ===
In the late 1980s, McCahill led the team at the University of Minnesota that developed POPmail, one of the first popular Internet e-mail clients. At about the same time as POPmail was being developed, Steve Dorner at the University of Illinois at Urbana-Champaign developed Eudora, and the user interface conventions found in these early efforts are still used in modern-day e-mail clients.

In 1991, McCahill led the original Gopher development team, which invented a simple way to navigate distributed information resources on the Internet. Gopher's menu-based hypermedia combined with full-text search engines paved the way for the popularization of the World Wide Web and was the de facto standard for Internet information systems in the early to mid 1990s.

Working with other pioneers such as Tim Berners-Lee, Marc Andreessen, Alan Emtage and Peter J. Deutsch (creators of Archie) and Jon Postel, McCahill was involved in creating and codifying the standard for Uniform Resource Locators (URLs).

In the mid 90s, McCahill's team developed GopherVR, a 3D user interface for the Gopher protocol to explore how spatial metaphors could be used to organize information and create social spaces.

He is said to have coined or popularized the phrase "surfing the Internet". However, prior to McCahill's first use of the phrase in February, 1992, the analogy was used in a comic Book, The Adventures of Captain Internet and CERF Boy, published in October, 1991 by one of the early Internet Service Providers, CERFnet.

=== Later work ===
In April 2007, McCahill left the University of Minnesota to join the Office of Information Technology at Duke University as an architect of 3-D learning and collaborative systems. A major focus of his later work has been virtual worlds, and he was one of six principal architects of the Croquet Project. As of the summer of 2026, McCahill served as team lead for Duke Code+'s Redrawing Democracy Visualization Platform project, a team which he described as "the greatest Code+ team Duke has ever seen."

=== Virtual worlds ===
In February 2010, Mark McCahill was revealed by the philosopher Peter Ludlow (also known by the pseudonym Urizenus Sklar) to be the Internet persona Pixeleen Mistral, a noted "tabloid reporter" covering virtual worlds who was the editor of Ludlow's newspaper The Alphaville Herald. In a 2016 interview with Leo Laporte, McCahill said that his involvement with developing the Croquet Project had led him into contact with Second Life and that he had become interested in the sociology of virtual worlds. As Pixeleen Mistral, he was a prominent reporter on Second Life, and a celebrity inside the game, although his real identity was not known by anyone for many years.
