= STRS =

STRS or Strs may refer to:

- Short tandem repeats, in DNA testing
- St. Thomas Residential School, Thiruvananthapuram, Kerala, India
- Sir Thomas Rich's School, Longlevens, Gloucester, England
- South Thames Retrieval Service, a medical transport service affiliated with Evelina Children's Hospital, London
- Sprouse-Reitz (NASDAQ symbol: STRS), a defunct American retail chain
- Strauss Group (Tel Aviv Stock Exchange symbol: STRS), an Israeli food company

== See also ==
- STR (disambiguation)
- California State Teachers' Retirement System, (CalSTRS)
