= STR =

STR, StR, Str or str may refer to:

== Gaming and computing ==
- Abbreviation for Strength
- .str, a video file included in a PlayStation (PS1) video game and contains a cinematic played in the game
- Suspend to RAM, S3 power state in computing
- Synchronous transmit-receive, an IBM communications protocol
- Sort-Tile-Recursive, bulk-loading method for an R-Tree data structure
- str or STR, term for character string or function in some programming languages, see Comparison of programming languages (string functions)
- Steps to reproduce, a sequence of actions that will reproduce a problem, typically used in debugging software

== Sports and transportation ==
- Scuderia Toro Rosso, a Formula One motor racing team
- Jaguar STR, a car
- South Tynedale Railway, an English heritage railway
- Stranraer Harbour railway station code
- Stuttgart Airport, Germany, IATA code

== Medicine ==
- Short tandem repeat or microsatellite, in a genome
- Specialty registrar (StR), UK medical title
- Swedish Twin Registry, a registry of twins in Sweden established in 1961

== Other ==
- Séminaire Saint-Joseph de Trois-Rivières, a school in Quebec
- Specialized Technology Resources, an American corporation
- STR, Inc hotel industry data company, formerly Smith Travel Research
- Special Theory of Relativity
- Short-term rental, accommodation rented for short periods of time
- Silambarasan (born 1983), an Indian actor and film producer also known as Silambarasan Thesingu Rajendar or STR
- Suspicious Transaction Report by a financial institution

== See also ==
- Ester (disambiguation)
- Ster, short for Dutch: Stichting Ether Reclame, lit. 'Foundation for Broadcast Advertising', responsible for Nederlandse Publieke Omroep's radio, television and online ads
- Stir (disambiguation)
