= Stir =

Stir, STIR, stirred, or stirrer may refer to:

== Art and entertainment ==
- Stir (band), a music group from 1994-2005
- Stir (1980 film), a 1980 Australian film directed by Stephen Wallace
- Stir (1997 film), a 1997 American film starring Tony Todd
- Stir (TV series)
- "Stirred", a West Wing episode
- Stirring (film), a 1975 Australian film directed by Jane Oehr

== Business ==
- STIR future (short-term interest rate), in stocks

== Technology ==
- Short tau inversion recovery (STIR), a magnetic resonance imaging (MRI) sequence
- SHAKEN/STIR, Secure Telephone Identity Revisited (STIR) standards
- Stirrer, an agitator (device)
- Stirring rod
- STIR (radar), a type of fire control radar

== See also ==
- Stire, a cider apple variety
- Stires, a surname
- Shaken, not stirred (disambiguation)
- Mix (disambiguation)
