= National Children's Air Ambulance =

English charity paediatric air ambulance

- Formation: 2005; 21 years ago
- Legal status: Registered charity
- Purpose: Transporting critically ill children in the UK
- Location: Rugby, Warwickshire, England
- Region served: United Kingdom
- Parent organization: The Air Ambulance Service
- Website: theairambulanceservice.org.uk/childrens-air-ambulance/

The National Children's Air Ambulance (NCAA) is a charity-funded air ambulance service that transfers critically ill children from local hospitals to specialist paediatric centres throughout Great Britain. It also moves specialist teams and equipment to local hospitals when a child is too sick to travel. The service also sometimes acts as a patient transport service, returning children and families home after treatment. It was founded in 2005, and has been operated by The Air Ambulance Service charity since 2011. More than 400 missions have been performed since the service began. The number of missions is anticipated to rise to more than 600 per year with the launch of the new helicopters.

== Operations ==
NCAA operates two helicopters from Oxford Airport and Gamston Airport. The airdesk which coordinates the service remains centrally based at Coventry Airport in the same office as Warwickshire & Northamptonshire Air Ambulance. The Children's Air Ambulance can reach anywhere in the UK within two hours and reach all of the UK's specialist children's units within 70 minutes. Children and clinical teams are moved using AgustaWestland AW169 helicopters, which were leased by the charity in 2017. The helicopters always fly with two pilots and, when transporting a child, generally carry between one and three NHS clinicians, including at least one senior nurse and often a consultant. The new helicopters have an extra seat which can be used for either a parent to accompany their child or an additional member of clinical staff.

TCAA is registered with the Care Quality Commission.

== Equipment ==
Children are transported in a bespoke stretcher, nicknamed 'Shrek', which was designed and built in partnership with consultant paediatricians and transport nurses. No specialised stretcher for paediatric helicopter transfer existed at the time. The stretcher can carry a baby up to 8 kg (18 lb) in a specialist ‘baby pod’, or facilitate larger babies and children on the stretcher mattress. Its design allows for the equipment needed for paediatric intensive care to be secure and easily operated, whether in flight or on the ground.

== Clinical partners ==
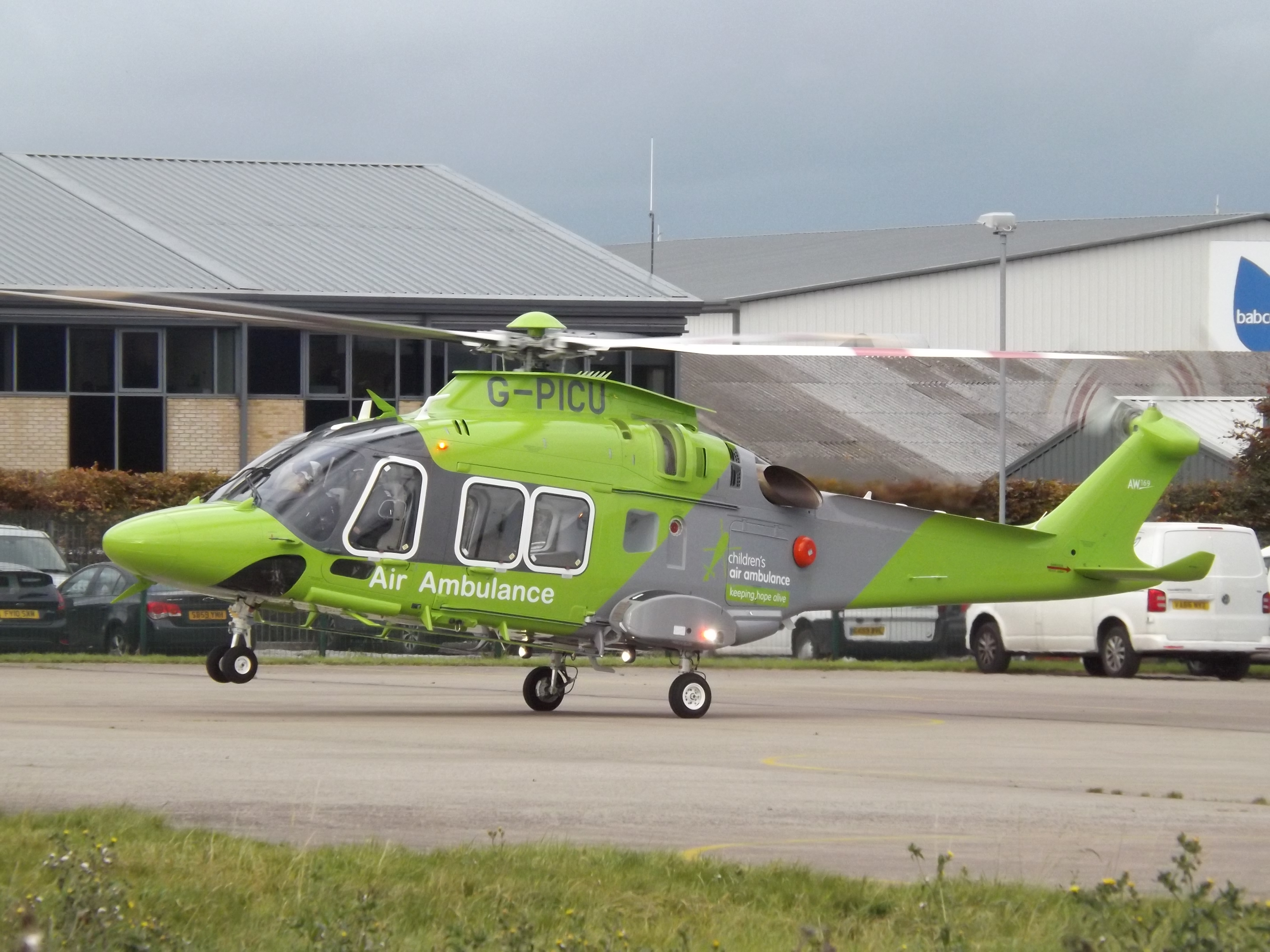
G-PICU, one of the helicopters based at Oxford Airport

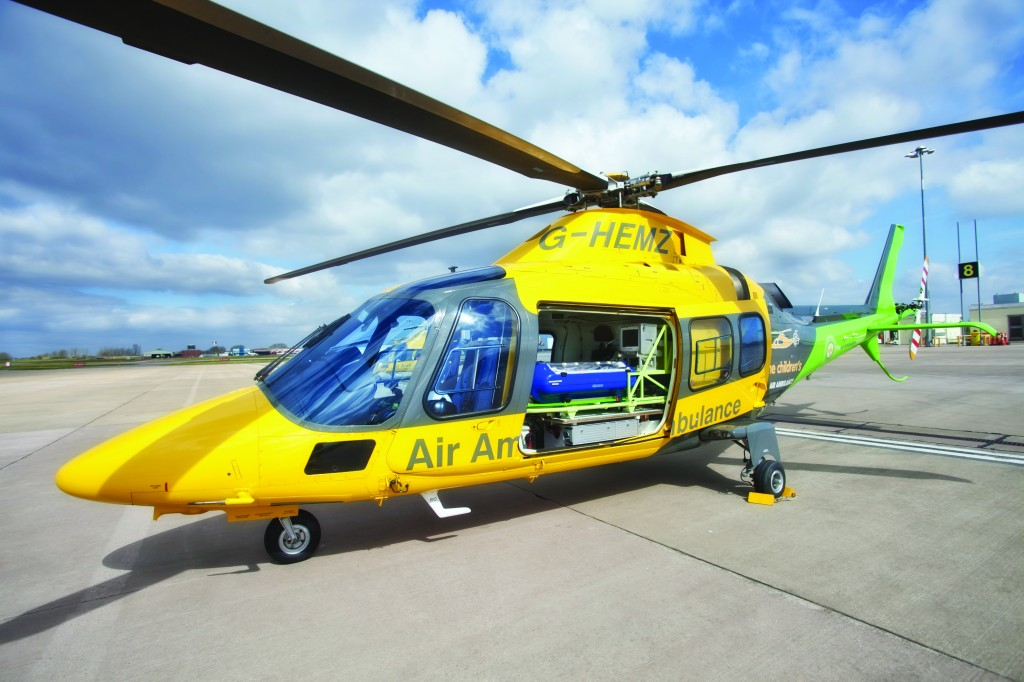
G-HEMZ, the former Children's Air Ambulance at Coventry Airport.

TCAA has ten clinical partners which commission transfers:

- The North West and North Wales Transport Service (NWTS)
- East Midlands Children's Heart Care Association (ECMO)
- The Children's Acute Transport Service (CATS)
- The Southampton Oxford Retrieval Team (SORT)
- Embrace
- South Thames Retrieval Service (STRS)
- Leicester PICU's transfer team
- Wales & West Acute Transport for Children (WATCh)
- Southwest Neonatal Advice and Retrieval team (SoNAR)
- kids intensive care and decision support /Neonatal transfer service (Kids/NTS)

== History ==
TCAA was founded in 2005. It raised funds over a five-year period, but did not own, lease or provide an air ambulance service. Following an investigation by the Charity Commission into a range of complaints from the public, the charity was taken over by The Air Ambulance Service in 2011. At the time, The Air Ambulance Service operated the Warwickshire & Northamptonshire Air Ambulance and the Derbyshire, Leicestershire & Rutland Air Ambulance.

Under the management of The Air Ambulance Service, which had no connection in any way with the original charity, TCAA flew its first team transfer in December 2012, and its first baby in May 2013.

In September 2018, TCAA launched its two new AgustaWestland AW169 helicopters which are based at Oxford Airport and Doncaster Sheffield Airport. The new helicopters are significantly larger and higher specification than the previous aircraft featuring bespoke clinical equipment and an additional seat for a parent to accompany the patient and crew on transfers.

== Ambassadors ==
TCAA has a number of ambassadors supporting its work, including:

- Melaine Walcott
- David Gold, Head of Public Affairs at Royal Mail Group
- Anita Dobson
- Grace Woodward
- Stanley Fink, Baron Fink
- Brian May
- Katie Marshall

== Funding ==
Prior to being taken over by The Air Ambulance Service, the funding figures for the previous charity were as follows. In 2006 it raised £46,865 and spent £47,246, in 2007 it raised £19,466 and spent £2,265, in 2008 it raised £371 and spent £0, in 2009 it raised £56,542 and spent £52,232, in 2010 it raised £608,910 and spend £424,514, in 2011 it raised £563,189 and spent £488,659. In 2011 of the £488,659 spent, £427,600 was spent on governing and income generation, £61,000 was spent on charity purposes and £74,500 was retained.

TCAA and The Air Ambulance Service receive no government funding and are entirely supported by public and corporate donations. The Air Ambulance Service charity raised £11.2 million in 2013.

=== Shops ===
TCAA opened its first shop in 2012 in West Bridgford, Nottinghamshire and now has twenty across the UK which are concentrated in and around London, the M40 corridor and the Midlands.

The Stow-on-the-Wold shop was shortlisted for the 'WOW! Factor Best Shop Interior Award' at the Charity Retail Awards 2018.

== Criticisms ==
Prior to the launch of TCAA, both the NHS and other air ambulance charities questioned the need for the service and advised potential donors to avoid the project, fearing their own fundraising efforts would lose out.

In 2011, the Charity Commission published their report of an investigation into TCAA. It found that the charity had previously spent large amounts of income on consultancy with a company owned by the founder of the charity. The Charity Commission had also received large number of complaints regarding literature distributed by the charity that did not mention that the charity did not operate, hire or have access to an air ambulance. Advice and guidance was given on both matters. Subsequently, the charity was taken over by TAAS, who have no connection to the previous management.

In 2013, the head of the Dorset and Somerset Air Ambulance was interviewed by the BBC and made a number of criticisms against TCAA, particularly surrounding fundraising. He highlighted that the name of the parent charity, The Air Ambulance Service was giving the impression to potential donors that they were representing all UK air ambulances, when in fact they only operate three of them.

== See also ==
- Air ambulances in the United Kingdom
- Police aviation in the United Kingdom
