= Comparison of programming languages (string functions) =

String functions are used in computer programming languages to manipulate a string or query information about a string (some do both).

Most programming languages that have a string datatype will have some string functions although there may be other low-level ways within each language to handle strings directly. In object-oriented languages, string functions are often implemented as properties and methods of string objects. In functional and list-based languages a string is represented as a list (of character codes), therefore all list-manipulation procedures could be considered string functions. However such languages may implement a subset of explicit string-specific functions as well.

For functions that manipulate strings, modern object-oriented languages, like C# and Java have immutable strings and return a copy (in newly allocated dynamic memory), while others, like C manipulate the original string unless the programmer copies data to a new string. See for example Concatenation below.

The most basic example of a string function is the length(string) function. This function returns the length of a string literal.

e.g. length("hello world") would return 11.

Other languages may have string functions with similar or exactly the same syntax or parameters or outcomes. For example, in many languages the length function is usually represented as len(string). The below list of common functions aims to help limit this confusion.

== Common string functions (multi language reference) ==
String functions common to many languages are listed below, including the different names used. The below list of common functions aims to help programmers find the equivalent function in a language. String concatenation and regular expressions are handled in separate pages. Statements in guillemets (« … ») are optional.

=== CharAt ===
| Definition | charAt(string,integer) returns character. |
| Description | Returns character at index in the string. |
| Equivalent | See substring of length 1 character. |

| Format | Languages | Base index |
|---|---|---|
| string[i] | ALGOL 68, APL, Julia, Pascal, Object Pascal (Delphi), Seed7 | 1 |
| string[i] | C, C++, C#, Cobra, D, FreeBASIC, Go, Python, (Note: The index can be negative, which then indicates the number of places before the end of the string.) PHP, Ruby, Windows PowerShell, JavaScript, APL | 0 |
| string{i} | PHP (deprecated in 5.3) | 0 |
| string(i) | Ada | ≥1 |
| Mid(string,i,1) | VB | 1 |
| MID$(string,i,1) | BASIC | 1 |
| string.Chars(i) | VB.NET | 0 |
| string(i:i) | Fortran | 1 |
| string.charAt(i) | Java, JavaScript | 0 |
| string.[i] | OCaml, F# | 0 |
| string.chars().nth(i) | Rust (Note: In Rust, the str::chars method iterates over code points and the std::iter::Iterator::nth method on iterators returns the zero-indexed nth value from the iterator, or None.) | 0 |
| string[i,1] | Pick Basic | 1 |
| String.sub (string, i) | Standard ML | 0 |
| string !! i | Haskell | 0 |
| (string-ref string i) | Scheme | 0 |
| (char string i) | Common Lisp | 0 |
| (elt string i) | ISLISP | 0 |
| (get string i) | Clojure | 0 |
| substr(string, i, 1) | Perl 5 | 0 |
| substr(string, i, 1) string.substr(i, 1) | Raku (Note: The index can not be negative, use *-N where N indicate the number of places before the end of the string.) | 0 |
| substr(string, i, 1) | PL/I | 1 |
| substr(string, i, 1) | REXX | 1 |
| string.at(i) | C++ (with bounds checking) | 0 |
| lists:nth(i, string) | Erlang | 1 |
| [string characterAtIndex:i] | Objective-C (NSString * only) | 0 |
| string.sub(string, i, i) (string):sub(i, i) | Lua | 1 |
| string at: i | Smalltalk (w/ bounds checking) | 1 |
| string index string i | Tcl | 0 |
| StringTake[string, {i}] | Mathematica, Wolfram Language | 1 |
| string@i | Eiffel | 1 |
| string (i:1) | COBOL | 1 |
| ${string_param:i:1} | Bash | 0 |
| i⌷string | APL | 0 or 1 |

{ Example in Pascal }
var
  MyStr: string = 'Hello, World';
  MyChar: Char;
begin
  MyChar := MyStr[2];          // 'e'

# Example in ALGOL 68 #
"Hello, World"[2];             // 'e'

// Example in C
#include <stdio.h>

char myStr1[] = "Hello, World";
printf("%c", *(myStr1 + 1));      // 'e'
printf("%c", *(myStr1 + 7));      // 'W'
printf("%c", myStr1[11]);       // 'd'
printf("%s", myStr1);           // 'Hello, World'
printf("%s", "Hello(2), World(2)"); // 'Hello(2), World(2)'

import std;

using std::string;

char myStr1[] = "Hello(1), World(1)";
string myStr2 = "Hello(2), World(2)";
std::println("Hello(3), World(3)");  // 'Hello(3), World(3)'
std::println("{}", myStr2[6]);             // '2'
std::println("{}", myStr1.substr(5, 3));  // '(1)'

// Example in C#
"Hello, World"[2];             // 'l'

# Example in Perl 5
substr("Hello, World", 1, 1);  # 'e'

# Examples in Python
"Hello, World"[2]              #  'l'
"Hello, World"[-3]             #  'r'

# Example in Raku
"Hello, World".substr(1, 1);   # 'e'

' Example in Visual Basic
Mid("Hello, World",2,1)

' Example in Visual Basic .NET
"Hello, World".Chars(2)    '  "l"c

" Example in Smalltalk "
'Hello, World' at: 2.        "$e"

//Example in Rust
"Hello, World".chars().nth(2);   // Some('l')

=== Compare (integer result) ===
| Definition | compare(string_{1},string_{2}) returns integer. |
| Description | Compares two strings to each other. If they are equivalent, a zero is returned. Otherwise, most of these routines will return a positive or negative result corresponding to whether string_{1} is lexicographically greater than, or less than, respectively, than string_{2}. The exceptions are the Scheme and Rexx routines which return the index of the first mismatch, and Smalltalk which answer a comparison code telling how the receiver sorts relative to string parameter. |

| Format | Languages |
|---|---|
| IF string_{1}<string_{2} THEN -1 ELSE ABS (string_{1}>string_{2}) FI | ALGOL 68 |
| cmp(string_{1}, string_{2}) | Python 2 |
| (string_{1} > string_{2}) - (string_{1} < string_{2}) | Python |
| strcmp(string_{1}, string_{2}) | C, PHP |
| std.string.cmp(string_{1}, string_{2}) | D |
| StrComp(string_{1}, string_{2}) | VB, Object Pascal (Delphi) |
| string_{1} cmp string_{2} | Perl, Raku |
| string_{1} compare: string_{2} | Smalltalk (Squeak, Pharo) |
| string_{1} <=> string_{2} | Ruby, C++ (Note: In C++, the overloaded operator<=> method on a std::string returns a std::strong_ordering object (otherwise std::weak_ordering): less, equal (same as equivalent), or greater.) |
| string_{1}.compare(string_{2}) | C++, Swift (Foundation) |
| compare(string_{1}, string_{2}) | Rexx, Seed7 |
| compare(string_{1}, string_{2}, pad) | Rexx |
| CompareStr(string_{1}, string_{2}) | Pascal, Object Pascal (Delphi) |
| string_{1}.compareTo(string_{2}) | Cobra, Java |
| string_{1}.CompareTo(string_{2}) | VB .NET, C#, F# |
| (compare string_{1} string_{2}) | Clojure |
| (string= string_{1} string_{2}) | Common Lisp |
| (string-compare string_{1} string_{2} p< p= p>) | Scheme (SRFI 13) |
| (string= string_{1} string_{2}) | ISLISP |
| compare string_{1} string_{2} | OCaml |
| String.compare (string_{1}, string_{2}) | Standard ML (Note: returns LESS, EQUAL, or GREATER) |
| compare string_{1} string_{2} | Haskell (Note: returns LT, EQ, or GT) |
| [string]::Compare(string_{1}, string_{2}) | Windows PowerShell |
| [string_{1} compare:string_{2}] | Objective-C (NSString * only) |
| LLT(string_{1},string_{2}); LLE(string_{1},string_{2}); LGT(string_{1},string_{2}); LGE(string_{1},string_{2}) | Fortran (Note: returns .TRUE. or .FALSE.. These functions are based on the ASCII collating sequence.) |
| string_{1}.localeCompare(string_{2}) | JavaScript |
| bytes.Compare([]byte(string_{1}), []byte(string_{2})) | Go |
| string compare string_{1} string_{2} | Tcl |
| compare(string_{1},string_{2},count) | PL/I (Note: IBM extension.) |
| string_{1}.cmp(string_{2}) | Rust (Note: In Rust, the std::cmp::Ord::cmp method on a string returns an std::cmp::Ordering: Less, Equal, or Greater.) |

# Example in Perl 5
"hello" cmp "world";       # returns -1

# Example in Python
cmp("hello", "world")      # returns -1

# Examples in Raku
"hello" cmp "world";       # returns Less
"world" cmp "hello";       # returns More
"hello" cmp "hello";       # returns Same

/** Example in Rexx */
compare("hello", "world")  /* returns index of mismatch: 1 */

; Example in Scheme
(use-modules (srfi srfi-13))
; returns index of mismatch: 0
(string-compare "hello" "world" values values values)

=== Compare (relational operator-based, Boolean result) ===
| Definition | string_{1} OP string_{2} OR (compare string_{1} string_{2}) returns Boolean. |
| Description | Lexicographically compares two strings using a relational operator or function. Boolean result returned. |

| Format | Languages |
|---|---|
| string_{1} OP string_{2}, where OP can be any of =, <>, <, >, <= and >= | Pascal, Object Pascal (Delphi), OCaml, Seed7, Standard ML, BASIC, VB, VB .NET, F# |
| string_{1} OP string_{2}, where OP can be any of =, /=, ≠, <, >, <=, ≤ and ≥; Also: EQ, NE, LT, LE, GE and GT | ALGOL 68 |
| (stringOP? string_{1} string_{2}), where OP can be any of =, -ci=, <, -ci<, >, -ci>, <=, -ci<=, >= and -ci>= (operators starting with '-ci' are case-insensitive) | Scheme |
| (stringOP string_{1} string_{2}), where OP can be any of =, -ci=, <>, -ci<>, <, -ci<, >, -ci>, <=, -ci<=, >= and -ci>= (operators starting with '-ci' are case-insensitive) | Scheme (SRFI 13) |
| (stringOP string_{1} string_{2}), where OP can be any of =, -equal, /=, -not-equal, <, -lessp, >, -greaterp, <=, -not-greaterp, >= and -not-lessp (the verbal operators are case-insensitive) | Common Lisp |
| (stringOP string_{1} string_{2}), where OP can be any of =, /=, <, >, <=, and >= | ISLISP |
| string_{1} OP string_{2}, where OP can be any of =, \=, <, >, <= and >= (Note: The original REXX used ¬ for Logical Not, ANSI Rexx uses \, some implementations accept ~ or ^, and non-EBCDIC implementations vary as to whether ¬ is at code point AA or AC.) | Rexx |
| string_{1} OP string_{2}, where OP can be any of =, ¬=, <, >, <=, >=, ¬< and ¬> (Note: The original PL/I used ¬ for Logical Not, some implementations expect ^, and non-EBCDIC implementations vary as to whether ¬ is at code point AA or AC.) | PL/I |
| string_{1} OP string_{2}, where OP can be any of =, /=, <, >, <= and >= | Ada |
| string_{1} OP string_{2}, where OP can be any of ==, /=, <, >, =< and >= | Erlang |
| string_{1} OP string_{2}, where OP can be any of ==, /=, <, >, <= and >= | Haskell |
| string_{1} OP string_{2}, where OP can be any of eq, ne, lt, gt, le and ge | Perl, Raku |
| string_{1} OP string_{2}, where OP can be any of ==, !=, <, >, <= and >= | C++, C#, D, Go, JavaScript, Python, PHP, Ruby, Rust, (Note: In Rust, the operators == and != and the methods eq, ne are implemented by the std::cmp::PartialEq trait, and the operators <, >, <=, >= and the methods lt, gt, le, ge are implemented by the std::cmp::PartialOrd trait.) Swift |
| string_{1} OP string_{2}, where OP can be any of -eq, -ceq, -ne, -cne, -lt, -clt, -gt, -cgt, -le, -cle, -ge, and -cge (operators starting with 'c' are case-sensitive) | Windows PowerShell |
| string_{1} OP string_{2}, where OP can be any of ==, ~=, <, >, <= and >= | Lua |
| string_{1} OP string_{2}, where OP can be any of =, ~=, <, >, <= and >= | Smalltalk |
| string_{1} OP string_{2}, where OP can be any of ==, /=, <, >, <= and >=; Also: .EQ., .NE., .LT., .LE., .GT. and .GE. | Fortran (Note: The operators use the compiler's default collating sequence.) |
| string_{1} OP string_{2} where OP can be any of =, <>, <, >, <=, >= as well as worded equivalents | COBOL |
| string_{1} OP string_{2} where OP can be any of ==, <>, <, >, <= and >= | Cobra |
| string_{1} OP string_{2} is available in the syntax, but means comparison of the pointers pointing to the strings, not of the string contents. Use the Compare (integer result) function. | C, Java |
| string_{1}.METHOD(string_{2}) where METHOD is any of eq, ne, gt, lt, ge, le | Rust |

% Example in Erlang
"hello" > "world".            % returns false

# Example in Raku
"art" gt "painting";           # returns False
"art" lt "painting";           # returns True

# Example in Windows PowerShell
"hello" -gt "world"           # returns false

;; Example in Common Lisp
(string> "art" "painting")      ; returns nil
(string< "art" "painting")      ; returns non nil

=== Concatenation ===
| Definition | concatenate(string_{1},string_{2}) returns string. |
| Description | Concatenates (joins) two strings to each other, returning the combined string. Some languages like C have mutable strings, so really the second string is being appended to the first string and the mutated string is returned. |

| Format | Languages |
|---|---|
| string_{1} adjacent_to string_{2} | Rexx (abutment, equivalent to string_{1} || string_{2}) |
| string_{1} whitespace string_{2} | Rexx (equivalent to string_{1} || ' ' || string_{2}) |
| string_{1} & string_{2} | Ada, FreeBASIC, Seed7, BASIC, VB, VB .NET, COBOL (between literals only) |
| strcat(string_{1}, string_{2}) | C (char* only) (Note: modifies string_{1}, which must have enough space to store the result) |
| string_{1} . string_{2} | Perl, PHP |
| string_{1} + string_{2} | ALGOL 68, C++, C#, Cobra, FreeBASIC, Go, Pascal, Object Pascal (Delphi), Java, JavaScript, Windows PowerShell, Python, Ruby, Rust, (Note: In Rust, the + operator is implemented by the std::ops::Add trait.) F#, Swift, Turing, VB |
| string_{1} ~ string_{2} | D, Raku |
| (string-append string_{1} string_{2}) | Scheme, ISLISP |
| (concatenate 'string string_{1} string_{2}) | Common Lisp |
| (str string_{1} string_{2}) | Clojure |
| string_{1} || string_{2} | Rexx, SQL, PL/I |
| string_{1} // string_{2} | Fortran |
| string_{1} ++ string_{2} | Erlang, Haskell |
| string_{1} ^ string_{2} | OCaml, Standard ML, F# |
| [string_{1} stringByAppendingString:string_{2}] | Objective-C (NSString * only) |
| string_{1} .. string_{2} | Lua |
| string_{1} , string_{2} | Smalltalk, APL |
| string_{1} string_{2} | SNOBOL |
| string_{1}string_{2} | Bash |
| string_{1} <> string_{2} | Mathematica |
| concat string_{1} string_{2} | Tcl |

{ Example in Pascal }
'abc' + 'def';      // returns "abcdef"

// Example in C#
"abc" + "def";      // returns "abcdef"

' Example in Visual Basic
"abc" & "def"       '  returns "abcdef"
"abc" + "def"       '  returns "abcdef"
"abc" & Null        '  returns "abc"
"abc" + Null        '  returns Null

// Example in D
"abc" ~ "def";      // returns "abcdef"

;; Example in common lisp
(concatenate 'string "abc " "def " "ghi")  ; returns "abc def ghi"

# Example in Perl 5
"abc" . "def";      # returns "abcdef"
"Perl " . 5;        # returns "Perl 5"

/* Example in PL/I */
"abc" || "def"      /* returns "abcdef" */

# Example in Raku
"abc" ~ "def";      # returns "abcdef"
"Perl " ~ 6;        # returns "Perl 6"

/* Example in Rexx */
"Strike"2           /* returns "Strike2" */
"Strike"    2       /* returns "Strike 2" */

=== Contains ===
| Definition | contains(string,substring) returns boolean |
| Description | Returns whether string contains substring as a substring. This is equivalent to using Find and then detecting that it does not result in the failure condition listed in the third column of the Find section. However, some languages have a simpler way of expressing this test. |
| Related | Find |

| Format | Languages |
|---|---|
| string_in_string(string, loc int, substring) | ALGOL 68 |
| ContainsStr(string, substring) | Object Pascal (Delphi) |
| strstr(string, substring) != NULL | C (char* only) |
| string.Contains(substring) | C#, VB .NET, Windows PowerShell, F# |
| string.contains(substring) | Cobra, Java (1.5+), Raku, Rust, (Note: See the str::contains method.) C++ (Note: See the std::basic_string::contains method.) |
| string.indexOf(substring) >= 0 | JavaScript |
| strpos(string, substring) !== false | PHP |
| str_contains(string, substring) | PHP (8+) |
| pos(string, substring) <> 0 | Seed7 |
| substring in string | Cobra, Python (2.3+) |
| string.find(string, substring) ~= nil | Lua |
| string.include?(substring) | Ruby |
| Data.List.isInfixOf substring string | Haskell (GHC 6.6+) |
| string includesSubstring: substring | Smalltalk (Squeak, Pharo, Smalltalk/X) |
| String.isSubstring substring string | Standard ML |
| (search substring string) | Common Lisp |
| (not (null (string-index substring string))) | ISLISP |
| (substring? substring string) | Clojure |
| ! StringFreeQ[string, substring] | Mathematica |
| index(string, substring, startpos)>0 | Fortran, PL/I (Note: startpos is IBM extension.) |
| index(string, substring, occurrence)>0 | Pick Basic |
| strings.Contains(string, substring) | Go |
| string.find(substring) != string::npos | C++ |
| [string containsString:substring] | Objective-C (NSString * only, iOS 8+/OS X 10.10+) |
| string.rangeOfString(substring) != nil | Swift (Foundation) |
| ∨/substring⍷string | APL |

¢ Example in ALGOL 68 ¢
string in string("e", loc int, "Hello mate");      ¢ returns true ¢
string in string("z", loc int, "word");            ¢ returns false ¢

// Example In C#
"Hello mate".Contains("e");      // returns true
"word".Contains("z");            // returns false

#  Example in Python
"e" in "Hello mate"              #  returns true
"z" in "word"                    #  returns false

#  Example in Raku
"Good morning!".contains('z')    #  returns False
"¡Buenos días!".contains('í');   #  returns True

"  Example in Smalltalk "
'Hello mate' includesSubstring: 'e'  " returns true "
'word' includesSubstring: 'z'        " returns false "

=== Equality ===
Tests if two strings are equal. See also #Compare and #Compare. Doing equality checks via a generic Compare with integer result is not only confusing for the programmer but is often a significantly more expensive operation; this is especially true when using "C-strings".

| Format | Languages |
|---|---|
| string_{1} == string_{2} | Python, C++, C#, Cobra, Go, JavaScript (similarity), PHP (similarity), Ruby, Rust, Erlang, Haskell, Lua, D, Mathematica, Swift |
| string_{1} === string_{2} | JavaScript, PHP |
| string_{1} == string_{2} string_{1} .EQ. string_{2} | Fortran |
| strcmp(string_{1}, string_{2}) == 0 | C |
| (string=? string_{1} string_{2}) | Scheme |
| (string= string_{1} string_{2}) | Common Lisp, ISLISP |
| string_{1} = string_{2} | ALGOL 68, Ada, Object Pascal (Delphi), OCaml, Pascal, Rexx, Seed7, Standard ML, BASIC, VB, VB .NET, F#, Smalltalk, PL/I, COBOL |
| test string_{1} = string_{2} [ string_{1} = string_{2} ] | Bourne Shell |
| string_{1} eq string_{2} | Perl, Raku, Tcl |
| string_{1}.equals(string_{2}) | Cobra, Java |
| string_{1}.Equals(string_{2}) | C# |
| string_{1} -eq string_{2} [string]::Equals(string_{1}, string_{2}) | Windows PowerShell |
| [string_{1} isEqualToString:string_{2}] [string_{1} isEqual:string_{2}] | Objective-C (NSString * only) |
| string_{1} ≡ string_{2} | APL |
| string_{1}.eq(string_{2}) | Rust |

// Example in C#
"hello" == "world"           // returns false

' Example in Visual Basic
"hello" = "world"            '  returns false

# Examples in Perl 5
'hello' eq 'world'           # returns 0
'hello' eq 'hello'           # returns 1

# Examples in Raku
'hello' eq 'world'           # returns False
'hello' eq 'hello'           # returns True

# Example in Windows PowerShell
"hello" -eq "world"          #  returns false

⍝ Example in APL
'hello' ≡ 'world'          ⍝  returns 0

=== Find ===
| Definition | find(string,substring) returns integer |
| Description | Returns the position of the start of the first occurrence of substring in string. If the substring is not found most of these routines return an invalid index value – -1 where indexes are 0-based, 0 where they are 1-based – or some value to be interpreted as Boolean FALSE. |
| Related | instrrev |

| Format | Languages | If not found |
|---|---|---|
| string in string(substring, pos, string[startpos:]) | ALGOL 68 | returns BOOL: TRUE or FALSE, and position in REF INT pos. |
| InStr(«startpos,»string,substring) | VB (positions start at 1) | returns 0 |
| INSTR$(string,substring) | BASIC (positions start at 1) | returns 0 |
| index(string,substring) | AWK | returns 0 |
| index(string,substring«,startpos») | Perl 5 | returns −1 |
| index(string,substring«,startpos») string.index(substring,«,startpos») | Raku | returns Nil |
| instr(«startpos,»string,substring) | FreeBASIC | returns 0 |
| strpos(string,substring«,startpos») | PHP | returns FALSE |
| locate(string, substring) | Ingres | returns string length + 1 |
| strstr(string, substring) | C (char* only, returns pointer to first character) | returns NULL |
| std.string.indexOf(string, substring) | D | returns −1 |
| pos(string, substring«, startpos») | Seed7 | returns 0 |
| strings.Index(string, substring) | Go | returns −1 |
| pos(substring, string) | Pascal, Object Pascal (Delphi) | returns 0 |
| pos(substring, string«,startpos») | Rexx | returns 0 |
| string.find(substring«,startpos») | C++ | returns std::string::npos |
| string.find(substring«,startpos«,endpos»») | Python | returns −1 |
| string.index(substring«,startpos«,endpos»») | Python | raises ValueError |
| string.index(substring«,startpos») | Ruby | returns nil |
| string.indexOf(substring«,startpos») | Java, JavaScript | returns −1 |
| string.IndexOf(substring«,startpos«, charcount»») | VB .NET, C#, Windows PowerShell, F# | returns −1 |
| string:str(string, substring) | Erlang | returns 0 |
| (string-contains string substring) | Scheme (SRFI 13) | returns #f |
| (search substring string) | Common Lisp | returns NIL |
| (string-index substring string) | ISLISP | returns nil |
| List.findIndex (List.isPrefixOf substring) (List.tails string) | Haskell (returns only index) | returns Nothing |
| Str.search_forward (Str.regexp_string substring) string 0 | OCaml | raises Not_found |
| Substring.size (#1 (Substring.position substring (Substring.full string))) | Standard ML | returns string length |
| [string rangeOfString:substring].location | Objective-C (NSString * only) | returns NSNotFound |
| string.find(string, substring) (string):find(substring) | Lua | returns nil |
| string indexOfSubCollection: substring startingAt: startpos ifAbsent: aBlock string findString: substring startingAt: startpos | Smalltalk (Squeak, Pharo) | evaluate aBlock which is a block closure (or any object understanding value) returns 0 |
| startpos = INDEX(string, substring «,back» «, kind») | Fortran | returns 0 if substring is not in string; returns LEN(string)+1 if substring is empty |
| POSITION(substring IN string) | SQL | returns 0 (positions start at 1) |
| index(string, substring, startpos ) | PL/I | returns 0 (positions start at 1) |
| index(string, substring, occurrence ) | Pick Basic | returns 0 if occurrence of substring is not in string; (positions start at 1) |
| string.indexOf(substring«,startpos«, charcount»») | Cobra | returns −1 |
| string first substring string startpos | Tcl | returns −1 |
| (substring⍷string)⍳1 | APL | returns 1 + the last position in string |
| string.find(substring) | Rust (Note: See the str::find method.) | returns None |

Examples

- Common Lisp
  (search "e" "Hello mate")             ;  returns 1
(search "z" "word")                   ;  returns NIL
- C#
  "Hello mate".IndexOf("e");            // returns 1
"Hello mate".IndexOf("e", 4);         // returns 9
"word".IndexOf("z");                  // returns -1
- Raku
  "Hello, there!".index('e')           # returns 1
"Hello, there!".index('z')           # returns Nil
- Scheme
  (use-modules (srfi srfi-13))
(string-contains "Hello mate" "e")    ;  returns 1
(string-contains "word" "z")          ;  returns #f
- Visual Basic
  ' Examples in
InStr("Hello mate", "e")              '  returns 2
InStr(5, "Hello mate", "e")           '  returns 10
InStr("word", "z")                    '  returns 0
- Smalltalk
  'Hello mate' indexOfSubCollection:'ate'  "returns 8"
  'Hello mate' indexOfSubCollection:'late' "returns 0"
  I'Hello mate'
    indexOfSubCollection:'late'
    ifAbsent:[ 99 ]                      "returns 99"
  'Hello mate'
    indexOfSubCollection:'late'
    ifAbsent:[ self error ]              "raises an exception"

=== Find character ===
| Definition | find_character(string,char) returns integer |
| Description | Returns the position of the start of the first occurrence of the character char in string. If the character is not found most of these routines return an invalid index value – -1 where indexes are 0-based, 0 where they are 1-based – or some value to be interpreted as Boolean FALSE. This can be accomplished as a special case of #Find, with a string of one character; but it may be simpler or more efficient in many languages to locate just one character. Also, in many languages, characters and strings are different types, so it is convenient to have such a function. |
| Related | find |

| Format | Languages | If not found |
|---|---|---|
| char in string(char, pos, string[startpos:]) | ALGOL 68 | returns BOOL: TRUE or FALSE, and position in REF INT pos. |
| instr(string, any char«,startpos») (char, can contain more them one char, in which case the position of the first appearance of any of them is returned.) | FreeBASIC | returns 0 |
| strchr(string,char) | C, (char* only, returns pointer to character) | returns NULL |
| std.string.find(string, dchar) | D | returns −1 |
| string.find(char«,startpos») | C++ | returns std::string::npos |
| pos(string, char«, startpos») | Seed7 | returns 0 |
| strings.IndexRune(string,char) | Go | returns −1 |
| string.indexOf(char«,startpos») | Java, JavaScript | returns −1 |
| string.IndexOf(char«,startpos«, charcount»») | VB .NET, C#, Windows PowerShell, F# | returns −1 |
| (position char string) | Common Lisp | returns NIL |
| (char-index char string) | ISLISP | returns nil |
| List.elemIndex char string | Haskell (returns Just index) | returns Nothing |
| String.index string char | OCaml | raises Not_found |
| position = SCAN (string, set «, back» «, kind») position = VERIFY (string, set «, back» «, kind»)^{[a]} | Fortran | returns zero |
| string indexOf: char ifAbsent: aBlock string indexOf: char string includes: char | Smalltalk | evaluate aBlock which is a BlockClosure (or any object understanding value) returns 0 returns true or false |
| index(string, char, startpos ) | PL/I | returns 0 (positions start at 1) |
| string.index(?char) | Ruby | returns nil |
| strpos(string,char,startpos) | PHP | returns false |
| string.indexOf(char«,startpos«, charcount»») | Cobra | returns −1 |
| string⍳char | APL | returns 1 + the last position in string |
| string.find(substring) | Rust | returns None |

// Examples in C#
"Hello mate".IndexOf('e');              // returns 1
"word".IndexOf('z')                     // returns -1

; Examples in Common Lisp
(position #\e "Hello mate")             ;  returns 1
(position #\z "word")                   ;  returns NIL

^a Given a set of characters, SCAN returns the position of the first character found, while VERIFY returns the position of the first character that does not belong to the set.

=== Format ===
| Definition | format(formatstring, items) returns string |
| Description | Returns the formatted string representation of one or more items. |

| Format | Languages | Format string syntax |
|---|---|---|
| associate(file, string); putf(file, $formatstring$, items) | ALGOL 68 | ALGOL |
| Format(item, formatstring) | VB | |
| sprintf(formatstring, items) | Perl, PHP, Raku, Ruby | C |
| item.fmt(formatstring) | Raku | C |
| io_lib:format(formatstring, items) | Erlang | |
| sprintf(outputstring, formatstring, items) | C | C |
| std::format(formatstring, items) | C++ | Python |
| std.string.format(formatstring, items) | D | C |
| Format(formatstring, items) | Object Pascal (Delphi) | |
| fmt.Sprintf(formatstring, items) | Go | C |
| printf formatstring items | Unix | C |
| formatstring % (items) | Python, Ruby | C |
| formatstring.format(items) | Python | .NET |
| fformatstring | Python 3 | Python |
| Printf.sprintf formatstring (Note: formatstring must be a fixed literal at compile time for it to have the correct type.) items | OCaml, F# | C |
| Text.Printf.printf formatstring items | Haskell (GHC) | C |
| formatstring printf: items | Smalltalk | C |
| String.format(formatstring, items) | Java | C |
| String.Format(formatstring, items) | VB .NET, C#, F# | .NET |
| (format formatstring items) | Scheme (SRFI 28) | Lisp |
| (format nil formatstring items) | Common Lisp | Lisp |
| (format formatstring items) | Clojure | Lisp |
| formatstring -f items | Windows PowerShell | .NET |
| [NSString stringWithFormat:formatstring, items] | Objective-C (NSString * only) | C |
| String(format:formatstring, items) | Swift (Foundation) | C |
| string.format(formatstring, items) (formatstring):format(items) | Lua | C |
| WRITE (outputstring, formatstring) items | Fortran | Fortran |
| put string(string) edit(items)(format) | PL/I | PL/I (similar to Fortran) |
| String.format(formatstring, items) | Cobra | .NET |
| format formatstring items | Tcl | C |
| formatnumbers ⍕ items formatstring ⎕FMT items | APL | APL |
| format!(formatstring, items) | Rust (Note: See std::format, which is imported by the Rust prelude so that it can be used under the name format.) | Python |

using System;

// Example in C#
String.Format("My {0} costs {1:C2}", "pen", 19.99); // returns "My pen costs $19.99"

// Example in Object Pascal (Delphi)
Format('My %s costs $%2f', ['pen', 19.99]);         // returns "My pen costs $19.99"

// Example in Java
String.format("My %s costs $%2f", "pen", 19.99);    // returns "My pen costs $19.99"

# Examples in Raku
sprintf "My %s costs \$%.2f", "pen", 19.99;          # returns "My pen costs $19.99"
1.fmt("%04d");                                       # returns "0001"

# Example in Python
"My %s costs $%.2f" % ("pen", 19.99);                #  returns "My pen costs $19.99"
"My {0} costs ${1:.2f}".format("pen", 19.99);        #  returns "My pen costs $19.99"

#Example in Python 3.6+
pen = "pen"
f"My {pen} costs {19.99}"                                          #returns "My pen costs 19.99"

; Example in Scheme
(format "My ~a costs $~1,2F" "pen" 19.99)           ;  returns "My pen costs $19.99"

/* example in PL/I */
put string(some_string) edit('My ', 'pen', ' costs', 19.99)(a,a,a,p'$$$V.99')
/* returns "My pen costs $19.99" */

=== Inequality ===
Tests if two strings are not equal. See also #Equality.

| Format | Languages |
|---|---|
| string_{1} ne string_{2} string_{1} NE string_{2} | ALGOL 68 – The operator "**ne**" occurs in **bold** type-font. |
| string_{1} /= string_{2} | ALGOL 68, Ada, Erlang, Fortran, Haskell |
| string_{1} <> string_{2} | BASIC, VB, VB .NET, Pascal, Object Pascal (Delphi), OCaml, PHP, Seed7, Standard ML, F#, COBOL, Cobra, Python 2 (deprecated) |
| string_{1} # string_{2} | BASIC (some implementations) |
| string_{1} ne string_{2} | Perl, Raku |
| (string<> string_{1} string_{2}) | Scheme (SRFI 13) |
| (string/= string_{1} string_{2}) | Common Lisp |
| (string/= string_{1} string_{2}) | ISLISP |
| (not= string_{1} string_{2}) | Clojure |
| string_{1} != string_{2} | C++, C#, Go, JavaScript (not similar), PHP (not similar), Python, Ruby, Rust, Swift, D, Mathematica |
| string_{1} !== string_{2} | JavaScript, PHP |
| string_{1} \= string_{2} | Rexx |
| string_{1} ¬= string_{2} | PL/I |
| test string_{1} != string_{2} [ string_{1} != string_{2} ] | Bourne Shell |
| string_{1} -ne string_{2} -not [string]::Equals(string_{1}, string_{2}) | Windows PowerShell |
| string_{1} ~= string_{2} | Lua, Smalltalk |
| string_{1} ≢ string_{2} | APL |
| string_{1}.ne(string_{2}) | Rust |

// Example in C#
"hello" != "world"    // returns true

' Example in Visual Basic
"hello" <> "world"    '  returns true

;; Example in Clojure
(not= "hello" "world")  ; ⇒ true

# Example in Perl 5
'hello' ne 'world'      # returns 1

# Example in Raku
'hello' ne 'world'      # returns True

# Example in Windows PowerShell
"hello" -ne "world"   #  returns true

=== index ===
see #Find

=== indexof ===
see #Find

=== instr ===
see #Find

=== instrrev ===
see #rfind

=== join ===
| Definition | join(separator, list_of_strings) returns a list of strings joined with a separator |
| Description | Joins the list of strings into a new string, with the separator string between each of the substrings. Opposite of split. |
| Related | sprintf |

| Format | Languages |
|---|---|
| std.string.join(array_of_strings, separator) | D |
| string:join(list_of_strings, separator) | Erlang |
| join(separator, list_of_strings) | Perl, PHP, Raku |
| implode(separator, array_of_strings) | PHP |
| separator.join(sequence_of_strings) | Python, Swift 1.x |
| array_of_strings.join(separator) | Ruby, JavaScript, Raku, Rust (Note: See the slice::join method.) |
| (string-join array_of_strings separator) | Scheme (SRFI 13) |
| (format nil "~{~a~^separator~}" array_of_strings) | Common Lisp |
| (clojure.string/join separator list_of_strings) (apply str (interpose separator list_of_strings)) | Clojure |
| strings.Join(array_of_strings, separator) | Go |
| join(array_of_strings, separator) | Seed7 |
| String.concat separator list_of_strings | OCaml |
| String.concatWith separator list_of_strings | Standard ML |
| Data.List.intercalate separator list_of_strings | Haskell (GHC 6.8+) |
| Join(array_of_strings, separator) | VB |
| String.Join(separator, array_of_strings) | VB .NET, C#, F# |
| String.join(separator, array_of_strings) | Java 8+ |
| &{$OFS=$separator; "$array_of_strings"} array_of_strings -join separator | Windows PowerShell |
| [array_of_strings componentsJoinedByString:separator] | Objective-C (NSString * only) |
| table.concat(table_of_strings, separator) | Lua |
| {|String streamContents: [ :stream | collectionOfAnything asStringOn: stream delimiter: separator ] collectionOfAnything joinUsing: separator | Smalltalk (Squeak, Pharo) |
| array_of_strings.join(separator«, final_separator») | Cobra |
| sequence_of_strings.joinWithSeparator(separator) | Swift 2.x |
| 1↓∊separator,¨list_of_strings | APL |

// Example in C#
String.Join("-", {"a", "b", "c"})  // "a-b-c"

" Example in Smalltalk "
#('a' 'b' 'c') joinUsing: '-'      " 'a-b-c' "

# Example in Perl 5
join( '-', ('a', 'b', 'c'));       # 'a-b-c'

# Example in Raku
<a b c>.join('-');       # 'a-b-c'

# Example in Python
"-".join(["a", "b", "c"])          #  'a-b-c'

# Example in Ruby
["a", "b", "c"].join("-")          #  'a-b-c'

; Example in Scheme
(use-modules (srfi srfi-13))
(string-join '("a" "b" "c") "-")   ;  "a-b-c"

=== lastindexof ===
see #rfind

=== left ===
| Definition | left(string,n) returns string |
| Description | Returns the left n part of a string. If n is greater than the length of the string then most implementations return the whole string (exceptions exist – see code examples). For variable-length encodings such as UTF-8, UTF-16 or Shift-JIS, it can be necessary to remove string positions at the end, to avoid invalid strings. |

| Format | Languages |
|---|---|
| string (string'First .. string'First + n - 1) | Ada |
| substr(string, 0, n) | AWK (changes string), Perl, PHP, Raku |
| LEFT$(string,n) | BASIC, VB |
| left(string,n) | VB, FreeBASIC, Ingres, Pick Basic |
| strncpy(string2, string, n) | C standard library |
| string.substr(0,n) | C++, Raku |
| [string substringToIndex:n] | Objective-C (NSString * only) |
| (apply str (take n string)) | Clojure |
| string[0 .. n] | D (Note: if n is larger than the length of the string, then in Debug mode core.exception.ArraySliceError is thrown, in Release mode, the behaviour is unspecified.) |
| string:substr(string, start, length) | Erlang |
| (subseq string 0 n) | Common Lisp |
| string[:n] | Cobra, Go, Python |
| left(string,n «,padchar») | Rexx, Erlang |
| string[0, n] string[0..n - 1] | Ruby |
| string[1, n] | Pick Basic |
| string[ .. n] | Seed7 |
| string.Substring(0,n) | VB .NET, C#, Windows PowerShell, F# |
| leftstr(string, n) | Pascal, Object Pascal (Delphi) |
| copy (string,1,n) | Turbo Pascal |
| string.substring(0,n) | Java, (Note: if n is larger than the length of the string, Java will throw an java.lang.IndexOutOfBoundsException) JavaScript |
| (string-take string n) | Scheme (SRFI 13) |
| take n string | Haskell |
| String.extract (string, n, NONE) | Standard ML |
| String.sub string 0 n | OCaml (Note: if n is larger than length of string, raises Invalid_argument) |
| string.[..n] | F# |
| string.sub(string, 1, n) (string):sub(1, n) | Lua |
| string first: n | Smalltalk (Squeak, Pharo) |
| string(:n) | Fortran |
| StringTake[string, n] | Mathematica (Note: if n is larger than length of string, throw the message "StringTake::take:") |
| string («FUNCTION» LENGTH(string) - n:n) | COBOL |
| string.substring(0, n) | Cobra |
| n↑string. | APL |
| string[0..n] string[..n] string.get(0..n) string.get(..n) | Rust (Note: In Rust, strings are indexed in terms of byte offsets and there is a runtime panic if the index is out of bounds or if it would result in invalid UTF-8. A &str (string reference) can be indexed by various types of ranges, including std::range::Range (0..n), std::slice::RangeFrom (n..), and RangeTo (..n) because they all implement the std::slice::SliceIndex trait with str being the type being indexed.) The str::get method is the non-panicking way to index. It returns None in the cases in which indexing would panic. |

# Example in Raku
"Hello, there!".substr(0, 6);  # returns "Hello,"

/* Examples in Rexx */
left("abcde", 3)         /* returns "abc"      */
left("abcde", 8)         /* returns "abcde   " */
left("abcde", 8, "*")    /* returns "abcde***" */

; Examples in Scheme
(use-modules (srfi srfi-13))
(string-take "abcde", 3) ;  returns "abc"
(string-take "abcde", 8) ;  error

' Examples in Visual Basic
Left("sandroguidi", 3)   '  returns "san"
Left("sandroguidi", 100) '  returns "sandroguidi"

=== len ===
see #length

=== length ===
| Definition | length(string) returns an integer number |
| Description | Returns the length of a string (not counting the null terminator or any other of the string's internal structural information). An empty string returns a length of 0. |

| Format | Returns | Languages |
|---|---|---|
| string'Length | | Ada |
| UPB string | | ALGOL 68 |
| echo "${#string_param}" | | Bash |
| length(string) | | Ingres, Perl 5, Pascal, Object Pascal (Delphi), Rexx, Seed7, SQL, PL/I |
| len(string) | | BASIC, FreeBASIC, Python, Go, Pick Basic |
| length(string), string:len(string) | | Erlang |
| Len(string) | | VB, Pick Basic |
| string.Length | Number of UTF-16 code units | VB .NET, C#, Windows PowerShell, F# |
| chars(string) string.chars | Number of graphemes (NFG) | Raku |
| codes(string) string.codes | Number of Unicode code points | Raku |
| string.size OR string.length | Number of bytes (Note: Ruby lacks Unicode support.) | Ruby |
| strlen(string) | Number of bytes | C, PHP |
| string.length() | | C++ |
| string.length | | Cobra, D, JavaScript |
| string.length() | Number of UTF-16 code units | Java |
| (string-length string) | | Scheme |
| (length string) | | Common Lisp, ISLISP |
| (count string) | | Clojure |
| String.length string | | OCaml |
| size string | | Standard ML |
| length string | Number of Unicode code points | Haskell |
| string.length | Number of UTF-16 code units | Objective-C (NSString * only) |
| string.characters.count | Number of characters | Swift (2.x) |
| count(string) | Number of characters | Swift (1.2) |
| countElements(string) | Number of characters | Swift (1.0–1.1) |
| string.len(string) (string):len() #string | | Lua |
| string size | | Smalltalk |
| LEN(string); LEN_TRIM(string) | | Fortran |
| StringLength[string] | | Mathematica |
| «FUNCTION» LENGTH(string) or «FUNCTION» BYTE-LENGTH(string) | number of characters and number of bytes, respectively | COBOL |
| string length string | a decimal string giving the number of characters | Tcl |
| ≢ string | | APL |
| string.len() | Number of bytes | Rust (Note: See the str::len method.) |
| string.chars().count() | Number of Unicode code points | Rust (Note: In Rust, the str::chars method iterates over code points and the std::iter::Iterator::count method on iterators consumes the iterator and returns the total number of elements in the iterator.) |

// Examples in C#
"hello".Length;      // returns 5
"".Length;           // returns 0

# Examples in Erlang
string:len("hello"). %  returns 5
string:len("").      %  returns 0

# Examples in Perl 5
length("hello");     #  returns 5
length("");          #  returns 0

# Examples in Raku
"".chars; chars "";          # both return 0
"".codes; codes "";          # both return 0

' Examples in Visual Basic
Len("hello")         '  returns 5
Len("")              '  returns 0

//Examples in Objective-C
[@"hello" Length]   //returns 5
[@"" Length]   //returns 0

-- Examples in Lua
("hello"):len() -- returns 5
#"" -- returns 0

=== locate ===
see #Find

=== Lowercase ===
| Definition | lowercase(string) returns string |
| Description | Returns the string in lower case. |

| Format | Languages |
|---|---|
| LCase(string) | VB |
| lcase(string) | FreeBASIC |
| lc(string) | Perl, Raku |
| string.lc | Raku |
| tolower(char) | C (Note: operates on one character) |
| std.string.toLower(string) | D |
| string | transform(to_lower) | to<string>() | C++ (Note: C++'s implementation uses pipe operator chaining rather than a proper to_lower()/to_upper() method. The symbols used are std::views::transform and std::ranges::to(). to_lower and to_upper are any lambda converting a character to lower and upper cases respectively (available in the global namespaces as ::tolower and ::toupper). Alternatively, this can be done with just ranges/pointers using the std::ranges::transform() function.) (Note: std::string only, result is stored in string result which is at least as long as string, and may or may not be string itself) |
| lowercase(string) | Object Pascal (Delphi) |
| strtolower(string) | PHP |
| lower(string) | Seed7 |
| ${string_param,,} | Bash |
| echo "string" | tr 'A-Z' 'a-z' | Unix |
| string.lower() | Python |
| downcase(string) | Pick Basic |
| string.downcase | Ruby (Note: only ASCII characters as Ruby lacks Unicode support) |
| strings.ToLower(string) | Go |
| (string-downcase string) | Scheme (R6RS), Common Lisp |
| (lower-case string) | Clojure |
| String.lowercase string | OCaml |
| String.map Char.toLower string | Standard ML |
| map Char.toLower string | Haskell |
| string.toLowerCase() | Java, JavaScript |
| to_lower(string) | Erlang |
| string.ToLower() | VB .NET, C#, Windows PowerShell, F# |
| string.lowercaseString | Objective-C (NSString * only), Swift (Foundation) |
| string.lower(string) (string):lower() | Lua |
| string asLowercase | Smalltalk |
| LOWER(string) | SQL |
| lowercase(string) | PL/I |
| ToLowerCase[string] | Mathematica |
| «FUNCTION» LOWER-CASE(string) | COBOL |
| string.toLower | Cobra |
| string tolower string | Tcl |
| string.to_lowercase() | Rust (Note: See the str::to_lowercase method.) |

// Example in C#
"Wiki means fast?".ToLower(); // "wiki means fast?"

; Example in Scheme
(use-modules (srfi srfi-13))
(string-downcase "Wiki means fast?") ;  "wiki means fast?"

// Example in C
#include <ctype.h>
#include <stdio.h>

int main(void) {
    char s[] = "Wiki means fast?";
    for (int i = 0; i < sizeof(s) - 1; ++i) {
        // transform characters in place, one by one
        s[i] = tolower(s[i]);
    }
    printf(string); // "wiki means fast?"
    return 0;
}

# Example in Raku
"Wiki means fast?".lc; # "wiki means fast?"

=== mid ===
see #substring

=== partition ===
| Definition | <string>.partition(separator) returns the sub-string before the separator; the separator; then the sub-string after the separator. |
| Description | Splits the given string by the separator and returns the three substrings that together make the original. |

| Format | Languages | Comments |
|---|---|---|
| string.partition(separator) | Python, Ruby(1.9+) | |
| lists:partition(pred, string) | Erlang | |
| split /(separator)/, string, 2 | Perl 5 | |
| split separator, string, 2 string.split( separator, 2 ) | Raku | Separator does not have to be a regular expression |

# Examples in Python
"Spam eggs spam spam and ham".partition('spam')   # ('Spam eggs ', 'spam', ' spam and ham')
"Spam eggs spam spam and ham".partition('X')      # ('Spam eggs spam spam and ham', "", "")

# Examples in Perl 5 / Raku
split /(spam)/, 'Spam eggs spam spam and ham' ,2;   # ('Spam eggs ', 'spam', ' spam and ham');
split /(X)/, 'Spam eggs spam spam and ham' ,2;      # ('Spam eggs spam spam and ham');

=== replace ===
| Definition | replace(string, find, replace) returns string |
| Description | Returns a string with find occurrences changed to replace. |

| Format | Languages |
|---|---|
| changestr(find, string, replace) | Rexx |
| std.string.replace(string, find, replace) | D |
| Replace(string, find, replace) | VB |
| replace(string, find, replace) | Seed7 |
| change(string, find, replace) | Pick Basic |
| string.Replace(find, replace) | C#, F#, VB .NET |
| str_replace(find, replace, string) | PHP |
| re:replace(string, find, replace, «{return, list}») | Erlang |
| string.replace(find, replace) | Cobra, Java (1.5+), Python, Rust (Note: See the str::replace method.) |
| string.replaceAll(find_regex, replace) | Java (Note: The "find" string in this construct is interpreted as a regular expression. Certain characters have special meaning in regular expressions. To find a string literally, the special characters must be quoted.) |
| string.gsub(find, replace) | Ruby |
| string =~ s/find_regex/replace/g | Perl 5 |
| string.subst(find, replace, :g) | Raku |
| string.replace(find, replace, "g") string.replace(/find_regex/g, replace) | JavaScript (Note: third parameter is non-standard) |
| echo "string" | sed 's/find_regex/replace/g' | Unix |
| ${string_param//find_pattern/replace} | Bash |
| string.replace(find, replace) string -replace find_regex, replace | Windows PowerShell |
| Str.global_replace (Str.regexp_string find) replace string | OCaml |
| [string stringByReplacingOccurrencesOfString:find withString:replace] | Objective-C (NSString * only) |
| string.stringByReplacingOccurrencesOfString(find, withString:replace) | Swift (Foundation) |
| string.gsub(string, find, replace) (string):gsub(find, replace) | Lua |
| string copyReplaceAll: find with: replace | Smalltalk (Squeak, Pharo) |
| string map {find replace} string | Tcl |
| StringReplace[string, find -> replace] | Mathematica |
| strings.Replace(string, find, replace, -1) | Go |
| INSPECT string REPLACING ALL/LEADING/FIRST find BY replace | COBOL |
| find_regex ⎕R replace_regex ⊢ string | APL |

// Examples in C#
"effffff".Replace("f", "jump");     // returns "ejumpjumpjumpjumpjumpjump"
"blah".Replace("z", "y");           // returns "blah"

// Examples in Java
"effffff".replace("f", "jump");     // returns "ejumpjumpjumpjumpjumpjump"
"effffff".replaceAll("f*", "jump"); // returns "ejump"

// Examples in Raku
"effffff".subst("f", "jump", :g);    # returns "ejumpjumpjumpjumpjumpjump"
"blah".subst("z", "y", :g);          # returns "blah"

' Examples in Visual Basic
Replace("effffff", "f", "jump")     '  returns "ejumpjumpjumpjumpjumpjump"
Replace("blah", "z", "y")           '  returns "blah"

# Examples in Windows PowerShell
"effffff" -replace "f", "jump"      #  returns "ejumpjumpjumpjumpjumpjump"
"effffff" -replace "f*", "jump"     #  returns "ejump"

=== reverse ===
| Definition | reverse(string) |
| Description | Reverses the order of the characters in the string. |

| Format | Languages |
|---|---|
| reverse string | Perl 5, Haskell |
| flip string string.flip | Raku |
| lists:reverse(string) | Erlang |
| strrev(string) | PHP |
| string[::-1] | Python |
| (string-reverse string) | Scheme (SRFI 13) |
| (reverse string) | Common Lisp |
| string.reverse | Ruby, D (modifies string) |
| new StringBuilder(string).reverse().toString() | Java |
| string | reverse | to<string>() | C++ (Note: C++'s implementation uses pipe operator chaining rather than a proper reverse() method. The symbols used are std::views::reverse and std::ranges::to(). Alternatively, this can be done with just ranges/pointers using the std::ranges::reverse() function.) (Note: std::string only, result is stored in string result which is at least as long as string, and may or may not be string itself) |
| StrReverse(string) | VB |
| string.Reverse() | VB .NET, C# |
| implode (rev (explode string)) | Standard ML |
| string.split("").reverse().join("") | JavaScript |
| string.reverse(string) (string):reverse() | Lua |
| string reverse | Smalltalk |
| StringReverse[string] | Mathematica |
| reverse(string) | PL/I |
| «FUNCTION» REVERSE(string) | COBOL |
| string.toCharArray.toList.reversed.join() | Cobra |
| String(string.characters.reverse()) | Swift (2.x) |
| String(reverse(string)) | Swift (1.2) |
| string reverse string | Tcl |
| ⌽string | APL |
| string.chars().rev().collect::<String>() | Rust (Note: In Rust, the str::chars method iterates over code points, the std::iter::Iterator::rev method on reversible iterators (std::iter::DoubleEndedIterator) creates a reversed iterator, and the std::iter::Iterator::collect method consumes the iterator and creates a collection (which here is specified as a std::string::String with the ::<> (sometimes called the "turbofish") syntax, used to explicitly specify the type) from the iterator's elements.) |
| echo string | rev | Unix |

" Example in Smalltalk "
'hello' reversed             " returns 'olleh' "

# Example in Perl 5
reverse "hello"              # returns "olleh"

# Example in Raku
"hello".flip                 # returns "olleh"

# Example in Python
"hello"[::-1]                # returns "olleh"

; Example in Scheme
(use-modules (srfi srfi-13))
(string-reverse "hello")     ; returns "olleh"

=== rfind ===
| Definition | rfind(string,substring) returns integer |
| Description | Returns the position of the start of the last occurrence of substring in string. If the substring is not found most of these routines return an invalid index value – -1 where indexes are 0-based, 0 where they are 1-based – or some value to be interpreted as Boolean FALSE. |
| Related | instr |

| Format | Languages | If not found |
|---|---|---|
| InStrRev(«startpos,» string,substring) | VB | returns 0 |
| instrrev(«startpos,» string,substring) | FreeBASIC | returns 0 |
| rindex(string,substring«,startpos») | Perl 5 | returns −1 |
| rindex(string,substring«,startpos») string.rindex(substring«,startpos») | Raku | returns Nil |
| strrpos(string,substring«,startpos») | PHP | returns FALSE |
| string.rfind(substring«,startpos») | C++ | returns std::string::npos |
| std.string.rfind(string, substring) | D | returns −1 |
| string.rfind(substring«,startpos«, endpos»») | Python | returns −1 |
| string.rindex(substring«,startpos«, endpos»») | Python | raises ValueError |
| rpos(string, substring«,startpos») | Seed7 | returns 0 |
| string.rindex(substring«,startpos») | Ruby | returns nil |
| strings.LastIndex(string, substring) | Go | returns −1 |
| string.lastIndexOf(substring«,startpos») | Java, JavaScript | returns −1 |
| string.LastIndexOf(substring«,startpos«, charcount»») | VB .NET, C#, Windows PowerShell, F# | returns −1 |
| (search substring string :from-end t) | Common Lisp | returns NIL |
| [string rangeOfString:substring options:NSBackwardsSearch].location | Objective-C (NSString * only) | returns NSNotFound |
| Str.search_backward (Str.regexp_string substring) string (Str.length string - 1) | OCaml | raises Not_found |
| string.match(string, '.*()'..substring) string:match('.*()'..substring) | Lua | returns nil |
| Ada.Strings.Unbounded.Index(Source => string, Pattern => substring, Going => Ada.Strings.Backward) | Ada | returns 0 |
| string.lastIndexOf(substring«,startpos«, charcount»») | Cobra | returns −1 |
| string lastIndexOfString:substring | Smalltalk | returns 0 |
| string last substring string startpos | Tcl | returns −1 |
| (⌽<\⌽substring⍷'string')⍳1 | APL | returns −1 |
| string.rfind(substring) | Rust (Note: See the str::rfind method.) | returns None |

; Examples in Common Lisp
(search "e" "Hello mate" :from-end t)     ;  returns 9
(search "z" "word" :from-end t)           ;  returns NIL

// Examples in C#
"Hello mate".LastIndexOf("e");           // returns 9
"Hello mate".LastIndexOf("e", 4);        // returns 1
"word".LastIndexOf("z");                 // returns -1

# Examples in Perl 5
rindex("Hello mate", "e");               # returns 9
rindex("Hello mate", "e", 4);            # returns 1
rindex("word", "z");                     # returns -1

# Examples in Raku
"Hello mate".rindex("e");                # returns 9
"Hello mate".rindex("e", 4);             # returns 1
"word".rindex('z');                      # returns Nil

' Examples in Visual Basic
InStrRev("Hello mate", "e")              '  returns 10
InStrRev(5, "Hello mate", "e")           '  returns 2
InStrRev("word", "z")                    '  returns 0

=== right ===
| Definition | right(string,n) returns string |
| Description | Returns the right n part of a string. If n is greater than the length of the string then most implementations return the whole string (exceptions exist – see code examples). |

| Format | Languages |
|---|---|
| string (string'Last - n + 1 .. string'Last) | Ada |
| Right(string,n) | VB |
| RIGHT$(string,n) | BASIC |
| right(string,n) | FreeBASIC, Ingres, Pick Basic |
| strcpy(string2, string+n) (n must not be greater than the length of string) | C |
| string.Substring(string.Length()-n) | C# |
| string[len(string)-n:] | Go |
| string.substring(string.length()-n) | Java |
| string.slice(-n) | JavaScript |
| right(string,n «,padchar») | Rexx, Erlang |
| substr(string,-n) | Perl 5, PHP |
| substr(string,*-n) string.substr(*-n) | Raku |
| string[-n:] | Cobra, Python |
| ${string_param: -n} (a space occurs after the colon) | Bash |
| string[n] | Pick Basic |
| (string-take-right string n) | Scheme (SRFI 13) |
| string[-n..-1] | Ruby |
| string[$-n .. $] | D (Note: if n is larger than length of string, then in Debug mode core.exception.ArraySliceError is thrown, and unspecified behaviour in Release mode) |
| String.sub string (String.length string - n) n | OCaml |
| string.sub(string, -n) (string):sub(-n) | Lua |
| string last: n | Smalltalk (Squeak, Pharo) |
| StringTake[string, -n] | Mathematica |
| string (1:n) | COBOL |
| ¯n↑string. | APL |
| string[n..] string.get(n..) | Rust |

// Examples in Java; extract rightmost 4 characters
String str = "CarDoor";
str.substring(str.length()-4); // returns 'Door'

# Examples in Raku
"abcde".substr(*-3);          # returns "cde"
"abcde".substr(*-8);          # 'out of range' error

/* Examples in Rexx */
right("abcde", 3)              /* returns "cde"      */
right("abcde", 8)              /* returns "   abcde" */
right("abcde", 8, "*")         /* returns "***abcde" */

; Examples in Scheme
(use-modules (srfi srfi-13))
(string-take-right "abcde", 3) ;  returns "cde"
(string-take-right "abcde", 8) ;  error

' Examples in Visual Basic
Right("sandroguidi", 3)        '  returns "idi"
Right("sandroguidi", 100)      '  returns "sandroguidi"

=== rpartition ===
| Definition | <string>.rpartition(separator) Searches for the separator from right-to-left within the string then returns the sub-string before the separator; the separator; then the sub-string after the separator. |
| Description | Splits the given string by the right-most separator and returns the three substrings that together make the original. |

| Format | Languages |
|---|---|
| string.rpartition(separator) | Python, Ruby |

# Examples in Python
"Spam eggs spam spam and ham".rpartition('spam')  ### ('Spam eggs spam ', 'spam', ' and ham')
"Spam eggs spam spam and ham".rpartition('X')     ### ("", "", 'Spam eggs spam spam and ham')

=== slice ===
see #substring

=== split ===
| Definition | <string>.split(separator[, limit]) splits a string on separator, optionally only up to a limited number of substrings |
| Description | Splits the given string by occurrences of the separator (itself a string) and returns a list (or array) of the substrings. If limit is given, after limit – 1 separators have been read, the rest of the string is made into the last substring, regardless of whether it has any separators in it. The Scheme and Erlang implementations are similar but differ in several ways. JavaScript differs also in that it cuts, it does not put the rest of the string into the last element. See the example here. The Cobra implementation will default to whitespace. Opposite of join. |

| Format | Languages |
|---|---|
| split(/separator/, string«, limit») | Perl 5 |
| split(separator, string«, limit») string.split(separator, «limit») | Raku |
| explode(separator, string«, limit») | PHP |
| string.split(separator«, limit-1») | Python |
| string | split(separator)« | take(limit) |» to<V>() | C++ (Note: C++'s implementation uses pipe operator chaining rather than a proper split() method. The symbols used are std::views::split, std::views::take, and std::ranges::to<V>() (where V is a range of some sort).) |
| string.split(separator«, limit») | JavaScript, Java, Ruby |
| string:tokens(string, sepchars) | Erlang |
| strings.Split(string, separator) strings.SplitN(string, separator, limit) | Go |
| (string-tokenize string« charset« start« end»»») | Scheme (SRFI 13) |
| Split(string, sepchars«, limit») | VB |
| string.Split(sepchars«, limit«, options»») | VB .NET, C#, F# |
| string -split separator«, limit«, options»» | Windows PowerShell |
| Str.split (Str.regexp_string separator) string | OCaml |
| std.string.split(string, separator) | D |
| [string componentsSeparatedByString:separator] | Objective-C (NSString * only) |
| string.componentsSeparatedByString(separator) | Swift (Foundation) |
| TStringList.Delimiter, TStringList.DelimitedText | Object Pascal |
| StringSplit[string, separator«, limit»] | Mathematica |
| string.split«(sepchars«, limit«, options»»)» | Cobra |
| split string separator | Tcl |
| (separator≠string)⊂string in APL2 separator(≠⊆⊢)string in Dyalog APL 16.0 | APL |
| string.split(separator) string.split(limit, separator) | Rust (Note: See the str::split and str::rsplit methods.) |

// Example in C#
"abc,defgh,ijk".Split(',');                 // {"abc", "defgh", "ijk"}
"abc,defgh;ijk".Split(',', ';');            // {"abc", "defgh", "ijk"}

% Example in Erlang
string:tokens("abc;defgh;ijk", ";").        %  ["abc", "defgh", "ijk"]

// Examples in Java
"abc,defgh,ijk".split(",");                 // {"abc", "defgh", "ijk"}
"abc,defgh;ijk".split(",|;");               // {"abc", "defgh", "ijk"}

{ Example in Pascal }
var
  lStrings: TStringList;
  lStr: string;
begin
  lStrings := TStringList.Create;
  lStrings.Delimiter := ',';
  lStrings.DelimitedText := 'abc,defgh,ijk';
  lStr := lStrings.Strings[0]; // 'abc'
  lStr := lStrings.Strings[1]; // 'defgh'
  lStr := lStrings.Strings[2]; // 'ijk'
end;

# Examples in Perl 5
split(/spam/, 'Spam eggs spam spam and ham'); # ('Spam eggs ', ' ', ' and ham')
split(/X/, 'Spam eggs spam spam and ham');    # ('Spam eggs spam spam and ham')

# Examples in Raku
'Spam eggs spam spam and ham'.split(/spam/);  # (Spam eggs     and ham)
split(/X/, 'Spam eggs spam spam and ham');    # (Spam eggs spam spam and ham)

=== sprintf ===
see #Format

=== strip ===
see #trim

=== strcmp ===
see #Compare (integer result)

=== substring ===
| Definition | substring(string, startpos, endpos) returns string substr(string, startpos, numChars) returns string |
| Description | Returns a substring of string between starting at startpos and endpos, or starting at startpos of length numChars. The resulting string is truncated if there are fewer than numChars characters beyond the starting point. endpos represents the index after the last character in the substring. For variable-length encodings such as UTF-8, UTF-16 or Shift-JIS, it can be necessary to remove string positions at the end, to avoid invalid strings. |

| Format | Languages |
|---|---|
| string[startpos:endpos] | ALGOL 68 (changes base index) |
| string (startpos .. endpos) | Ada (changes base index) |
| Mid(string, startpos, numChars) | VB |
| mid(string, startpos, numChars) | FreeBASIC |
| string[startpos+(⍳numChars)-~⎕IO] | APL |
| MID$(string, startpos, numChars) | BASIC |
| substr(string, startpos, numChars) | AWK (changes string), Perl 5, (Note: startpos can be negative, which indicates to start that number of places before the end of the string.) (Note: numChars can be negative, which indicates to end that number of places before the end of the string.) PHP |
| substr(string, startpos, numChars) string.substr(startpos, numChars) | Raku (Note: startpos can not be negative, use * - startpos to indicate to start that number of places before the end of the string.) (Note: numChars can not be negative, use * - numChars to indicate to end that number of places before the end of the string.) |
| substr(string, startpos «,numChars, padChar») | PL/I |
| substr(string, startpos «,numChars, padChar») | Rexx |
| string[startpos:endpos] | Cobra, Python, (Note: endpos can be negative, which indicates to end that number of places before the end of the string.) Go |
| string[startpos, numChars] | Pick Basic |
| string[startpos, numChars] string[startpos .. endpos-1] string[startpos ... endpos] | Ruby |
| string[startpos .. endpos] string[startpos len numChars] | Seed7 |
| string.slice(startpos«, endpos») | JavaScript |
| string.substr(startpos«, numChars») | C++, JavaScript |
| string.Substring(startpos, numChars) | VB .NET, C#, Windows PowerShell, F# |
| string.substring(startpos«, endpos») | Java, JavaScript |
| copy(string, startpos, numChars) | Object Pascal (Delphi) |
| (substring string startpos endpos) | Scheme |
| (subseq string startpos endpos) | Common Lisp |
| (subseq string startpos endpos) | ISLISP |
| String.sub string startpos numChars | OCaml |
| substring (string, startpos, numChars) | Standard ML |
| string:sub_string(string, startpos, endpos) string:substr(string, startpos, numChars) | Erlang |
| strncpy(result, string + startpos, numChars); | C |
| string[startpos .. endpos+1] | D |
| take numChars $ drop startpos string | Haskell |
| [string substringWithRange:NSMakeRange(startpos, numChars)] | Objective-C (NSString * only) |
| string.[startpos..endpos] | F# |
| string.sub(string, startpos, endpos) (string):sub(startpos, endpos) | Lua |
| string copyFrom: startpos to: endpos | Smalltalk |
| string(startpos:endpos) | Fortran |
| SUBSTRING(string FROM startpos «FOR numChars») | SQL |
| StringTake[string, {startpos, endpos}] | Mathematica |
| string (startpos:numChars) | COBOL |
| ${string_param:startpos:numChars} | Bash |
| string range string startpos endpos | Tcl |
| string[startpos..endpos] string.get(startpos..endpos) | Rust |

// Examples in C#
"abc".Substring(1, 1):      // returns "b"
"abc".Substring(1, 2);      // returns "bc"
"abc".Substring(1, 6);      // error

;; Examples in Common Lisp
(subseq "abc" 1 2)          ; returns "b"
(subseq "abc" 2)            ; returns "c"

% Examples in Erlang
string:substr("abc", 2, 1). %  returns "b"
string:substr("abc", 2).    %  returns "bc"

# Examples in Perl 5
substr("abc", 1, 1);       #  returns "b"
substr("abc", 1);          #  returns "bc"

# Examples in Raku
"abc".substr(1, 1);        #  returns "b"
"abc".substr(1);           #  returns "bc"

# Examples in Python
"abc"[1:2]                 #  returns "b"
"abc"[1:3]                 #  returns "bc"

/* Examples in Rexx */
substr("abc", 2, 1)         /* returns "b"      */
substr("abc", 2)            /* returns "bc"     */
substr("abc", 2, 6)         /* returns "bc    " */
substr("abc", 2, 6, "*")    /* returns "bc****" */

=== Uppercase ===
| Definition | uppercase(string) returns string |
| Description | Returns the string in upper case. |

| Format | Languages |
|---|---|
| UCase(string) | VB |
| ucase(string) | FreeBASIC |
| toupper(string) | AWK (changes string) |
| uc(string) | Perl, Raku |
| string.uc | Raku |
| toupper(char) | C (operates on one character) |
| for (size_t i = 0, len = strlen(string); i< len; i++) string[i] = toupper(string[i]); for (char* c = string; *c != '\0'; c++) *c = toupper(*c); | C (for char*/char[]) |
| std.string.toUpper(string) | D |
| string | transform(to_upper) | to<string>() | C++ (Note: std::string only, result is stored in string result which is at least as long as string, and may or may not be string itself) |
| uppercase(string) | Object Pascal (Delphi) |
| upcase(char) | Object Pascal (Delphi) (operates on one character) |
| strtoupper(string) | PHP |
| upper(string) | Seed7 |
| ${string_param^^} (mnemonic: ^ is pointing up) | Bash |
| echo "string" | tr 'a-z' 'A-Z' | Unix |
| translate(string); UPPER variables PARSE UPPER VAR SrcVar DstVar | Rexx |
| string.upper() | Python |
| upcase(string) | Pick Basic |
| string.upcase | Ruby |
| strings.ToUpper(string) | Go |
| (string-upcase string) | Scheme, Common Lisp |
| String.uppercase string | OCaml |
| String.map Char.toUpper string | Standard ML |
| map Char.toUpper string | Haskell |
| string.toUpperCase() | Java, JavaScript |
| string.uppercase() | Kotlin |
| to_upper(string) | Erlang |
| string.ToUpper() | VB .NET, C#, Windows PowerShell, F# |
| string.uppercaseString | Objective-C (NSString * only), Swift (Foundation) |
| string.upper(string) (string):upper() | Lua |
| string asUppercase | Smalltalk |
| UPPER(string) | SQL |
| ToUpperCase[string] | Mathematica |
| «FUNCTION» UPPER-CASE(string) | COBOL |
| string.toUpper | Cobra |
| string toupper string | Tcl |
| string.to_uppercase() | Rust (Note: In Rust, the str::to_uppercase method returns a newly allocated std::string::String with any lowercase characters changed to uppercase ones following the Unicode rules.) |

// Example in C#
"Wiki means fast?".ToUpper();      // "WIKI MEANS FAST?"

# Example in Perl 5
uc("Wiki means fast?");             # "WIKI MEANS FAST?"

# Example in Raku
uc("Wiki means fast?");             # "WIKI MEANS FAST?"
"Wiki means fast?".uc;              # "WIKI MEANS FAST?"

/* Example in Rexx */
translate("Wiki means fast?")      /* "WIKI MEANS FAST?" */

/* Example #2 */
A='This is an example.'
UPPER A                            /* "THIS IS AN EXAMPLE." */

/* Example #3 */
A='upper using Translate Function.'
Translate UPPER VAR A Z            /* Z="UPPER USING TRANSLATE FUNCTION." */

; Example in Scheme
(use-modules (srfi srfi-13))
(string-upcase "Wiki means fast?") ;  "WIKI MEANS FAST?"

' Example in Visual Basic
UCase("Wiki means fast?")          '  "WIKI MEANS FAST?"

=== trim ===
trim or strip is used to remove whitespace from the beginning, end, or both beginning and end, of a string.

| Example usage | Languages |
|---|---|
| String.Trim([chars]) | C#, VB.NET, Windows PowerShell |
| string.strip(); | D |
| (.trim string) | Clojure |
| sequence [ predicate? ] trim | Factor |
| (string-trim '(#\Space #\Tab #\Newline) string) | Common Lisp |
| (string-trim string) | Scheme |
| string.trim() | Java, JavaScript (1.8.1+, Firefox 3.5+), Rust (Note: In Rust, the str::trim method returns a reference to the original &str.) |
| string | drop_while(drop_spaces) | to<string>() | C++ (Note: C++'s implementation uses pipe operator chaining rather than a proper trim() method. The symbols used are std::views::drop_while and std::ranges::to(). drop_spaces is any lambda representing a predicate to identify whitespace.) |
| Trim(String) | Pascal, QBasic, Visual Basic, Delphi |
| trim(string[,left[,right]]) | PL/I |
| string.strip() | Python |
| strings.Trim(string, chars) | Go |
| LTRIM(RTRIM(String)) | Oracle SQL, T-SQL |
| strip(string [,option, char]) | REXX |
| string:strip(string [,option, char]) | Erlang |
| string.strip string.lstrip string.rstrip | Ruby |
| string.trim | Raku |
| trim(string) | PHP, Raku |
| [string stringByTrimmingCharactersInSet:[NSCharacterSet whitespaceAndNewlineCharacterSet]] | Objective-C using Cocoa |
| string withBlanksTrimmed string withoutSpaces string withoutSeparators | Smalltalk (Squeak, Pharo); Smalltalk |
| strip(string) | SAS |
| string trim $string | Tcl |
| TRIM(string); TRIM(ADJUSTL(string)) | Fortran |
| TRIM(string) | SQL |
| TRIM(string); LTrim(string); RTrim(String) | ColdFusion |
| String.trim string | OCaml 4+ |

Other languages

In languages without a built-in trim function, it is usually simple to create a custom function which accomplishes the same task.

==== APL ====
APL can use regular expressions directly:

Trim←'^ +| +$'⎕R''

Alternatively, a functional approach combining Boolean masks that filter away leading and trailing spaces:

Trim←{⍵/⍨(∨\∧∘⌽∨\∘⌽)' '≠⍵}

Or reverse and remove leading spaces, twice:

Trim←{(∨\' '≠⍵)/⍵}∘⌽⍣2

==== AWK ====
In AWK, one can use regular expressions to trim:

 ltrim(v) = gsub(/^[ \t]+/, "", v)
 rtrim(v) = gsub(/[ \t]+$/, "", v)
 trim(v)  = ltrim(v); rtrim(v)

or:

 function ltrim(s) { sub(/^[ \t]+/, "", s); return s }
 function rtrim(s) { sub(/[ \t]+$/, "", s); return s }
 function trim(s)  { return rtrim(ltrim(s)); }

==== C/C++ ====
There is no standard trim function in C. Most of the available string libraries for C contain code which implements trimming, or functions that significantly ease an efficient implementation. The function has also often been called EatWhitespace in some non-standard C libraries.

In C, programmers often combine a ltrim and rtrim to implement trim:

#include <ctype.h>
#include <string.h>

void rtrim(char* str) {
    char* s;
    s = str + strlen(str);
    while (--s >= str) {
        if (!isspace(*s)) {
            break;
        }
        *s = 0;
    }
}

void ltrim(char* str) {
    size_t n;
    n = 0;
    while (str[n] && isspace((unsigned char) str[n])) {
        n++;
    }
    memmove(str, str + n, strlen(str) - n + 1);
}

void trim(char* str) {
    rtrim(str);
    ltrim(str);
}

C++'s std::string_view has a remove_prefix(n) method, which moves the start of the view forward by n characters.

import std;

using std::string;
using std::string_view;

string s = "    Hello, world!";
string_view v = s;
v.remove_prefix(std::min(v.find_first_not_of(" "), v.length());

C++ also achieves string trimming using std::views::drop_while, rather than by a trim() method:

import std;

using std::string;
using std::string_view;
using std::ranges::to;
using std::views::drop_while;
using std::views::reverse;

string_view s = "     Hello, world!    ";
auto is_space = [](unsigned char c) -> bool {
    return std::isspace(c);
};

// Left trim
// "Hello, world!    "
string leftTrimmed = s
    | drop_while(is_space)
    | to<string>();

// Full trim
// "Hello, world!"
string fullTrim = s
    | drop_while(is_space)
    | reverse
    | drop_while(is_space)
    | reverse
    | to<string>();

Another open source C++ library Qt, has several trim variants, including a standard method for QString:

#include <QString>

QString trimmed = s.trimmed();

The Linux kernel also includes a strip function, strstrip(), since 2.6.18-rc1, which trims the string "in place". Since 2.6.33-rc1, the kernel uses strim() instead of strstrip() to avoid false warnings.

==== Haskell ====
A trim algorithm in Haskell:

 import Data.Char (isSpace)
 trim      :: String -> String
 trim      = f . f
    where f = reverse . dropWhile isSpace

may be interpreted as follows: f drops the preceding whitespace, and reverses the string. f is then again applied to its own output. The type signature (the second line) is optional.

==== J ====
The trim algorithm in J is a functional description:

     trim =. #~ [: (+./\ *. +./\.) ' '&~:

That is: filter (#~) for non-space characters (' '&~:) between leading (+./\) and (*.) trailing (+./\.) spaces.

==== JavaScript ====
There is a built-in trim function in JavaScript 1.8.1 (Firefox 3.5 and later), and the ECMAScript 5 standard. In earlier versions it can be added to the String object's prototype as follows:

String.prototype.trim = function() {
  return this.replace(/^\s+/g, "").replace(/\s+$/g, "");
};

==== Perl ====
Perl 5 has no built-in trim function. However, the functionality is commonly achieved using regular expressions.

Example:

$string =~ s/^\s+//;            # remove leading whitespace
$string =~ s/\s+$//;            # remove trailing whitespace

or:

$string =~ s/^\s+|\s+$//g ;     # remove both leading and trailing whitespace

These examples modify the value of the original variable $string.

Also available for Perl is StripLTSpace in String::Strip from CPAN.

There are, however, two functions that are commonly used to strip whitespace from the end of strings, chomp and chop:

- chop removes the last character from a string and returns it.
- chomp removes the trailing newline character(s) from a string if present. (What constitutes a newline is $INPUT_RECORD_SEPARATOR dependent).

In Raku, the upcoming sister language of Perl, strings have a trim method.

Example:

$string = $string.trim;     # remove leading and trailing whitespace
$string .= trim;            # same thing

==== PL/I ====
The PL/I trim BIF can trim characters from the left or the right. The syntax is trim(source[,left[,right]]). left specifies the characters to remove from the left while right specifies the characters to remove from the right; both default to a single space.

Examples:

- foo = trim(' Hi! ') /* 'Hi!' */;
- foo = trim('*Hi!*','*') /* 'Hi!*' */;
- foo = trim('*Hi!*','*','*') /* 'Hi!' */;

==== Rexx ====
The Rexx strip BIF can remove leading and trailing characters. The syntax is

trim(string[,[option][,char]

where option may be Both (default), Leading or Trailing and char must be a single character (default ' ').

Example:

string = ' Hi! '
say strip(string)         /* 'Hi!' */
say strip(string,'B')     /* 'Hi!' */
say strip(string,'L')     /* 'Hi! ' */
say strip(string,'T')     /* ' Hi!' */

==== Tcl ====
The Tcl string command has three relevant subcommands: trim, trimright and trimleft. For each of those commands, an additional argument may be specified: a string that represents a set of characters to remove—the default is whitespace (space, tab, newline, carriage return).

Example of trimming vowels:

set string onomatopoeia
set trimmed [string trim $string aeiou]         ;# result is nomatop
set r_trimmed [string trimright $string aeiou]  ;# result is onomatop
set l_trimmed [string trimleft $string aeiou]   ;# result is nomatopoeia

==== XSLT ====
XSLT includes the function normalize-space(string) which strips leading and trailing whitespace, in addition to replacing any whitespace sequence (including line breaks) with one space.

Example:

<xsl:variable name='trimmed'>
   <xsl:value-of select='normalize-space(string)'/>
</xsl:variable>

XSLT 2.0 includes regular expressions, providing another mechanism to perform string trimming.

Another XSLT technique for trimming is to utilize the XPath 2.0 substring() function.
