= Shaken, not stirred (disambiguation) =

"Shaken, not stirred" is a catchphrase associated with the fictional character James Bond.

Shaken, not stirred also may refer to:

- Shaken but Not Stirred, a 1982 video game based on James Bond

Music:

- Shaken Not Stirred (David Benoit album), 1994
- Shaken Not Stirred (Phil Vassar album), 2004
- Shaken Not Stirred (Michael Daugherty), a 1994 composition and James Bond tribute by Michael Daugherty
- Shaken (not stirred), by Tallah from The Generation of Danger, 2022

== See also ==
- STIR/SHAKEN, a telephone security protocol
- Shaken and Stirred: The David Arnold James Bond Project, a compilation of James Bond movie themes
