= South Thames Retrieval Service =

London medical transport service

- Guys and St Thomas' NHS Foundation Trust Evelina London Children’s Hospital, Westminster Bridge Road, London, SE1 7EH
- Shown in Lambeth

Geography
- Location: London, SE1, England, United Kingdom
- Coordinates: 51.498207°N 0.118445°W

Organisation
- Care system: NHS England

History
- Opened: 1998

Links
- Website: https://www.evelinalondon.nhs.uk/our-services/hospital/south-thames-retrieval-service/overview.aspx
- Lists: Hospitals in England

South Thames Retrieval Service (commonly referred to by the acronym STRS) is a paediatric intensive care transport service operating out of the Evelina London Children's Hospital in London, as part of the National Health Service. It provides both telephone advice and retrieval for seriously unwell children within Kent, Surrey, Sussex, and London based hospitals south of the river Thames. Occasionally it will operate in other areas, when the usual service for that area is out of capacity.

== Service operation ==
Should a seriously unwell child, that may require intensive care level support, present to a district general hospital within the service's operational geographic area, then the local hospital team will phone the STRS number and will discuss the presentation. The team may immediately activate or may provide advice on a "wait and see" basis.

A retrieval team is made up of a minimum of three staff members, though they have capacity to have four staff members on the team. A normal team will have a dedicated ambulance technician, a paediatric nurse, and then either a retrieval nurse practitioner or doctor. The service is overseen by a consultant who provides remote advice.

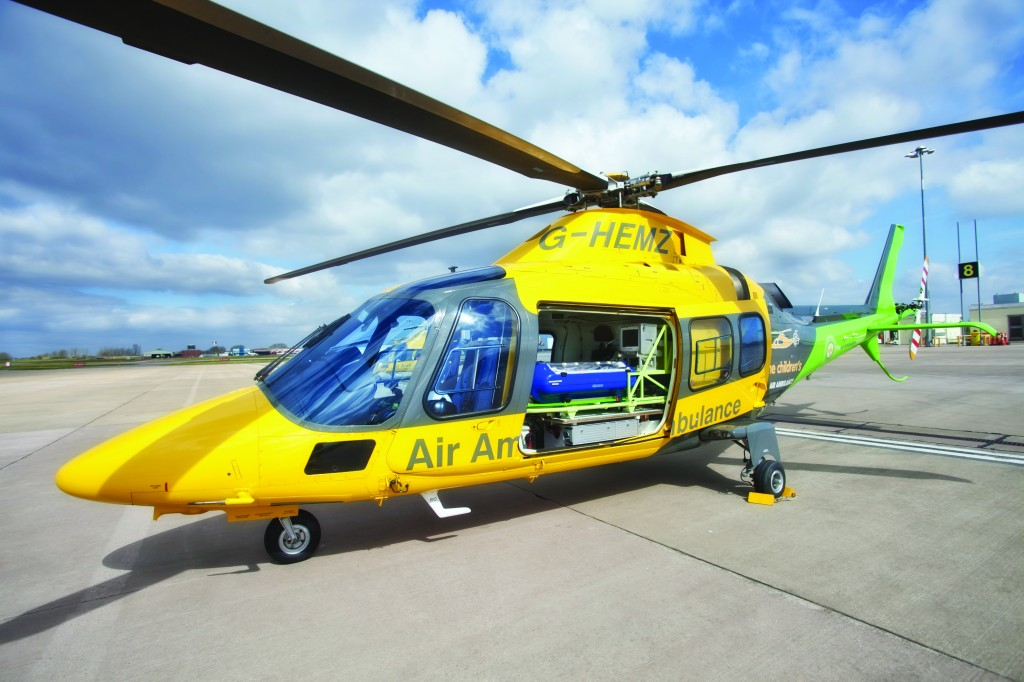
Earlier version of Children's Air Ambulance

When the team activates, they will simultaneously organise a bed for the child and plan the transport. Transport is primarily provided by one of three dedicated vehicles operated from the Evelina site, provided by a third party company (British Emergency Ambulance Response - BEARs). Previously the vehicles have been owned and operated by St John Ambulance. If the travel time is excessive then a helicopter provided by the Children's Air Ambulance may be used.

STRS also provides the retrieval element of the paediatric intensive care provision to Gibraltar, as their only civilian hospital (St Bernard's Hospital) has no paediatric intensive care unit. They use fixed wing aircraft, contracted from third party organisations, and an STRS ambulance is used for the final transfer from the airfield.

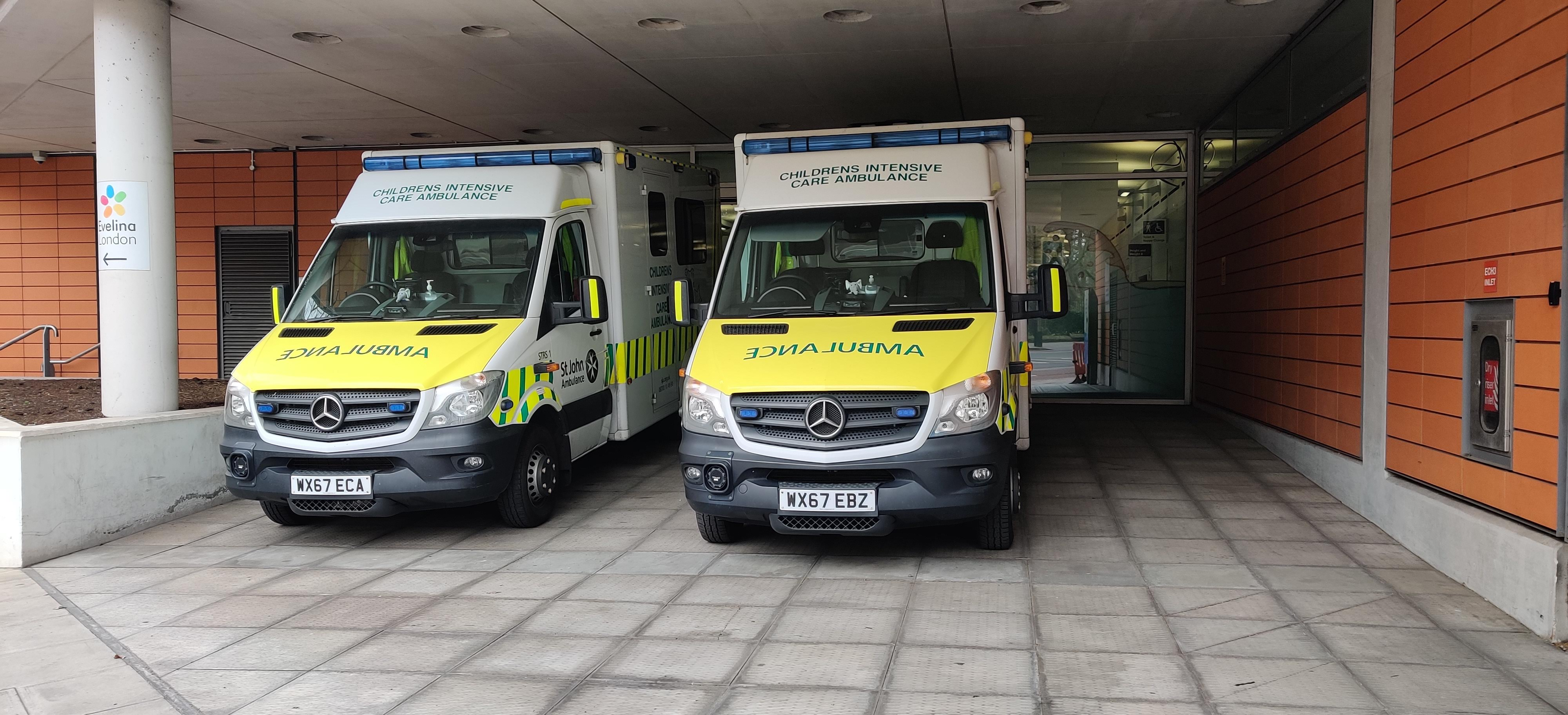
Previous dedicated vehicles operated by SJA
