= Stires =

Stires is a surname. Notable people with the surname include:

- Ernest M. Stires (1866–1951), American Episcopal bishop
- Ernie Stires (1925–2008), American composer, musician
- Gat Stires (1849–1933), American baseball player
- Shanele Stires (born 1972), American basketball player & coach
