= Syaiful =

Syaiful is a given name. Notable people with the name include:

- Syaiful Cahya (born 1992), Indonesian footballer
- Syaiful Iskandar, Singaporean footballer
- Syaiful Lewenusa (born 1986), Indonesian footballer
- Syaiful Ramadhan (born 1989), Indonesian footballer
- Syaiful Syamsuddin (born 1993), Indonesian footballer
- Syaiful Zero (born 1988), Malaysian actor

== See also ==
- Muhammad Syaiful Alias (born 1999), Malaysian footballer
- Muhammad Nur Syaiful Zulkafli (born 1995), Malaysian swimmer
