= Padusan =

Pre-Ramadan bathing ritual in Indonesia

Padusan is a Javanese tradition of purification adopted by the Abangan (Javanese Muslim) community. Padusan is used to cleanse the body and soul of sins in preparation for the holy month of Ramadan. People gather to bathe together in rivers, springs, ponds, or waterfalls, typically from noon to evening.

== Etymology ==
The term padusan comes from the Javanese word adus, meaning 'to bathe'.

== History and cultural context ==
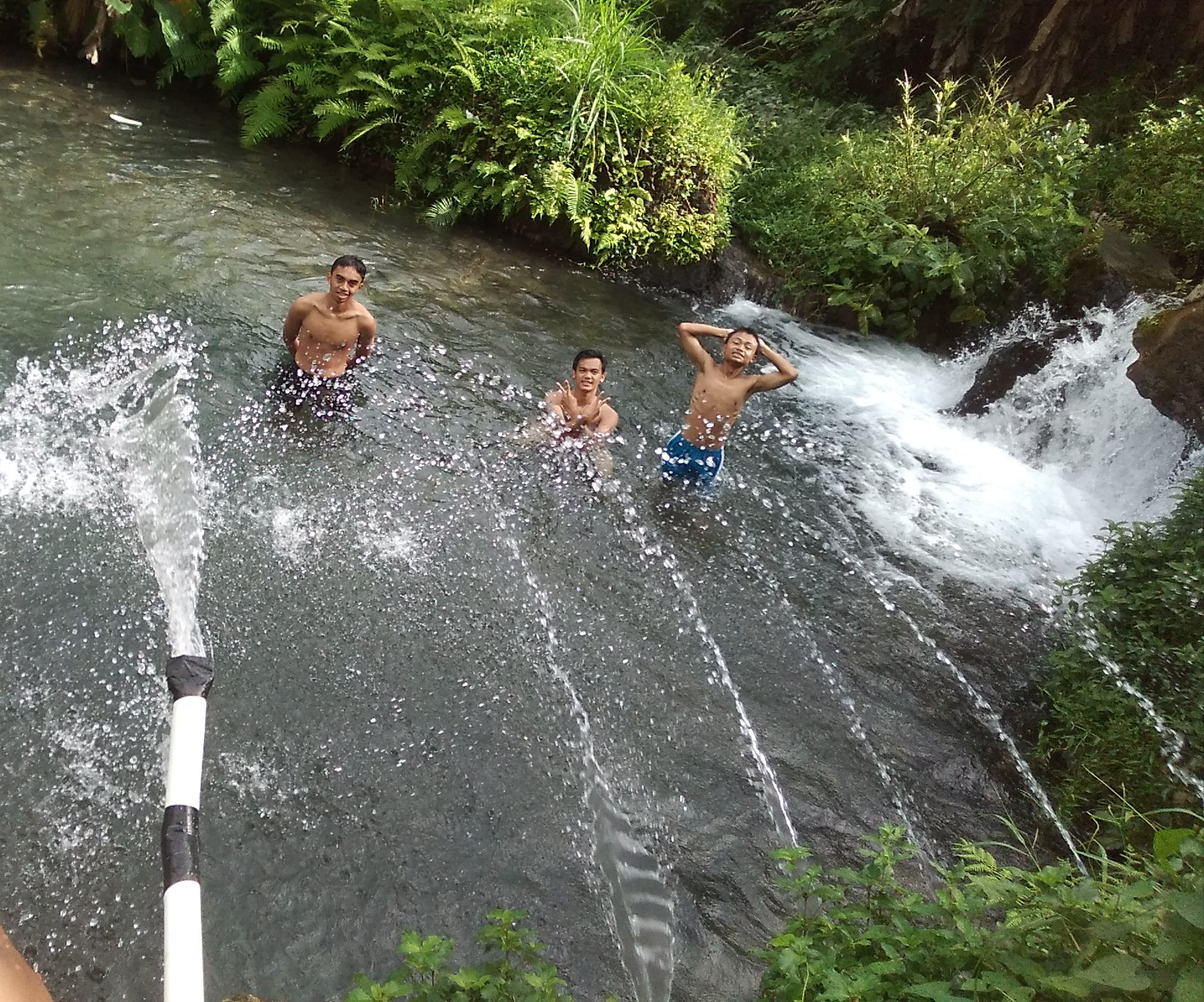
Kids bathing in celebrating Padusan

Padusan is commonly described in the ethnographic literature as a local purification rite that predates, or developed alongside, the Islamization of Java and was later incorporated into local Muslim practices. It is not an Islamic obligation but a cultural ritual with spiritual symbolism.

== Ritual practice ==
Padusan usually happens the day before Ramadan starts. People bathe together in natural water, sometimes adding fragrant herbs, or immerse themselves to clean both body and mind.

People gather at springs, rivers, waterfalls, swimming pools, and community baths, depending on local customs and the availability of water.

== Regional variations and contemporary observance ==
Across Central Java and Yogyakarta, how Padusan is observed often depends on local geography. Residents of Boyolali and Klaten go to mountain springs (umbul), while residents of Jepara and Temanggung go to rivers or public baths. In Yogyakarta, communities of Sleman gather at modern water parks or local fountains, while others head south to the beaches of Bantul and Gunungkidul.

In recent years, local governments and cultural organizations have begun to organize Padusan events. These gatherings attract visitors who want to witness or take part in the pre-Ramadan festivities.

== Social significance ==
Padusan functions as both a rite of individual purification and a communal event that reinforces social ties and local identity. In some areas the ritual also contributes to local cultural tourism and heritage programming.

== See also ==
- Petang Megang - Another spiritual bath prior Ramadan done in Pekanbaru
- Javanese culture
- Ritual purification
