= Petang Megang =

Petang Megang or also known as Petang Belimau is a tradition practiced by in Pekanbaru, Riau, as a sign of gratitude for being able to celebrate Ramadan. The word "Petang" means at evening or dusk, while "Megang" means to hold or start something. This tradition is performed as a step toward physical and spiritual self-preparation. It takes place in the afternoon, precisely one day before the start of Ramadan. This tradition has become a highly anticipated event for the people of Pekanbaru. Therefore, it is included in Pekanbaru's annual events, held annually before the holy month of Ramadan.

This tradition emerged in the 18th century, coinciding with the relocation of the center of the Sultanate of Siak Sri Indrapura from the Menpura River to Senapelan Hill (now known as Pekanbaru City). Usually the tradition is done at Siak Kota Pekanbaru bridge at Siak River area, Riau. The implementation of traditions at this location reflects the connection between the Malay community and the geographical and historical heritage that shapes their cultural identity.

== Tradition ==
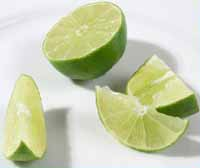
Lime was used as one of the ingridients for water ritual.

Petang Megang begins with a gathering at the Pekanbaru Grand Mosque, located not far from the banks of the Siak River, for congregational prayers. After prayers, the community, local officials, religious leaders, and traditional leaders head to the Siak River to bathe together. The procession to the Petang Megang location is usually accompanied by a procession accompanied by artistic performances.kompang or other Malay riau musical instruments.

The bathing process in the Siak River was opened by officials by urging that the "belimau" bathing procession be carried out happily and orderly without excess. Then the officials and religious figures took water and a tub of water and bathed 10 small children and teenagers. The water mixture contained water, lime juice, and 7 types of leaf flowers such as patchouli leaves, lemongrass, betel nut, and lime. After the procession, the people entered the river to bathe together. This procession became a symbol of self-purification ahead of Ramadan. Not only bathing together, the activity was also colored with entertainment performances in the form of kompang music and single organ, as well as the organization of a duck-catching competition to enliven the event.
