= Atu Zero =

Malaysian actor and comedian (born 1992)

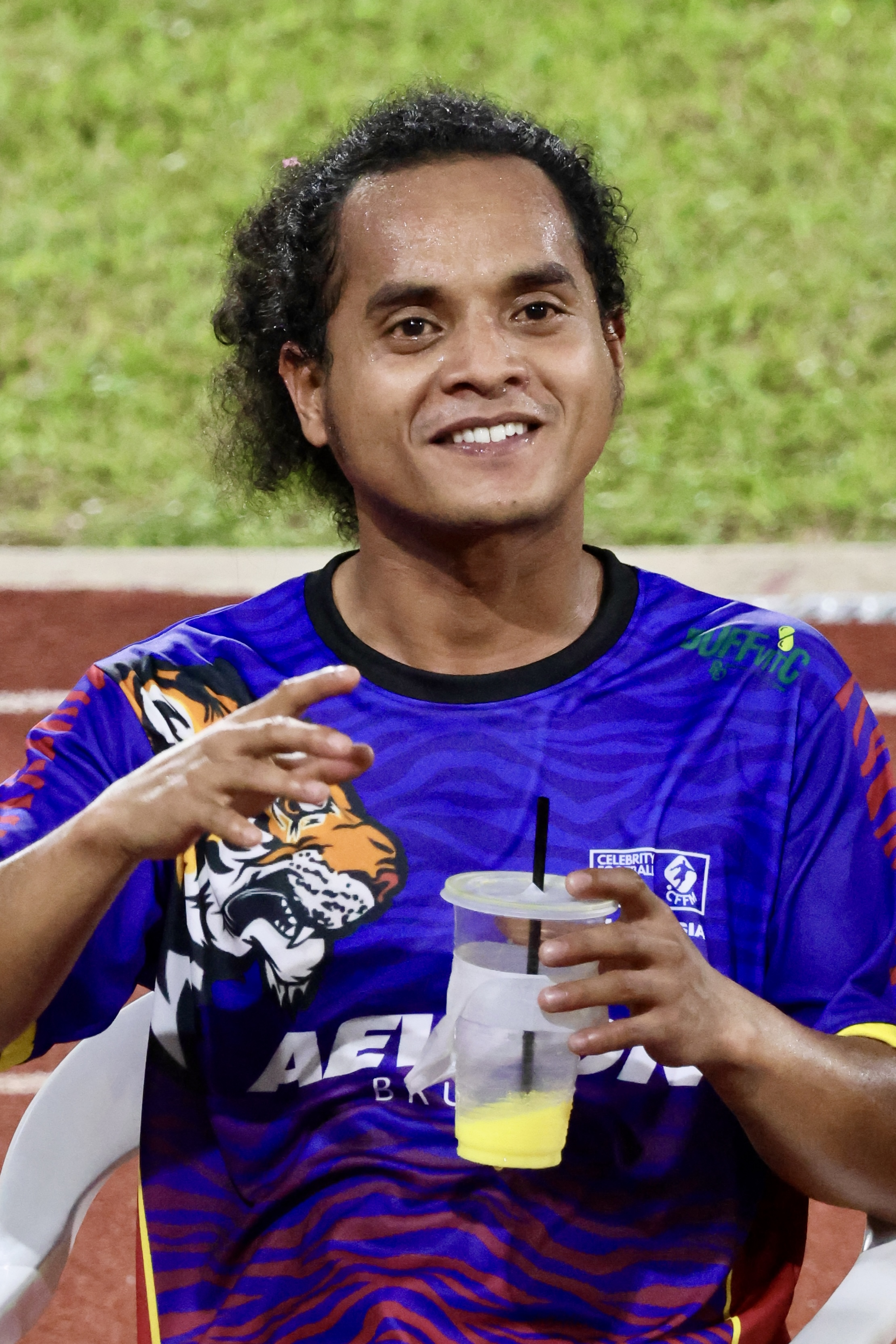
- Atu in 2024
- Born: Sharif Kunal bin Doli Sharif; 20 April 1992 (age 34); Kudat, Sabah, Malaysia
- Occupations: Actor; comedian
- Years active: 2012–present
- Relatives: Muhammad Syaiful (brother); Sharif Kadir (brother)

Sharif Kunal bin Doli Sharif (born 20 April 1992), commonly known by his stage name Atu Zero, is a Malaysian actor and comedian.

== Early life ==
Muhammad Syaiful, Sharif Kadir and Sharif Kunal are the sons of Sharif Doli, a traditional fisherman of Bajau descent and they are from Kudat, Sabah. With only RM$ 350 per month to their name, they had to struggle for a living with seven siblings. The youngest of the three, Atu, has been sailing since he was six years old. He started working as a laborer for his uncle Faisal when he was 13 years old, earning between RM$5–10 per hour. In an interview with Leaderonomics, the three brothers acknowledge that they were a naughty group even as young children.

== Career ==
Atu founded the Zero group with his two brothers, and they made their stage debut at the 2012 Gelanggang Awesome Raja Lawak. Their father died in his sleep on 21 October 2012. Atu was packing to travel to Africa for a Fear Factor episode he was involved in when he got the news. He flew from Kuala Lumpur to Kudat, but his father had already been buried before he arrived. He was never able to bid his father farewell.

The three brothers were having a hard time, but in 2013 they got lucky when they noticed an advertising on television for Astro's reality comedy program Maharaja Lawak Mega (MLM). From that point on, the trio's popularity grew quickly, and they were able to continue competing in the MLM competition for four seasons, from 2012 to 2018. Additionally, they competed in the MLM in 2014 and won the overall championship in the reality TV competition.

They attempted again the next year but were unable to get to the finals. They took home half a million ringgit after winning the MLM 2014 championship. The Zero group's debut film, Lu Mafia Gua Gangster, was scheduled to premiere in Malaysia on 21 April 2016. With a new horror comedy titled Syif Malam Raya that also stars his younger brother Atu, Sharif Kadir makes a comeback in 2020. After its recent on-demand debut on Astro First, the film generated RM$3 million in revenue in just ten days of release.

Atu issued an apology on 13 January 2020, in response to claims made by certain viewers that his attire for the MLM 2019 final caused them discomfort. Viewers complained that his form-fitting white get-up was excessively tight and exposing as he performed with his comedy troupe Zero. A comedic sketch about two astronauts finding life on Pluto was being performed by the Zero group.

In response to a widely shared Wikipedia entry in Malaysia on 19 October 2022, Atu stated that he has performed alongside several A-list performers, including as Ricky Martin, Bon Jovi, Blackpink, and BTS. Although he claimed not to take it seriously, he thought the comedy and inappropriate editing of Malaysians were entertaining.

In the VindesTepok Bulu 2023 badminton competition, Atu and Atita Haris participated. They both played badminton against Ziva Magnolya and Arya Saloka, losing to them both. Despite the fact that he did not take home the winning trophy, Atu said that he was grateful for the opportunity to perform at VindesTepok Bulu 2023. After he had just finished representing Malaysia in the tournament, Sharif and Syaiful expressed their pride in him.

== Personal life ==
In addition to having fun with their friends, they took part in a variety of school contests, including those involving religious singing (nasyid) and the playing of the kompang, a traditional Malay musical instrument, which they continue to practice for their performances to this day.

Despite their success, Atu claimed that the brothers still follow their old habits and that not much has changed in their life since then. He added that the brothers utilise their money to support their friends and relatives in the area because not everyone has it easy. Their motivation is not fame. Actually, because of all of their help, they have what they do now.

Atu married fashion designer Shafeeqa Johari on 8 February 2016, in her Batu Pahat, Johor, home. The closest and dearest friends and relatives were present. Prior to the Zero group's victory in the 2015 MLM competition, he met her. According to Atu, she is someone who respects his job as an actor and comedian and is not overly concerned with his degree. His wife has since become his contracting manager.

== Filmography ==
=== Film ===
Year	Title	Role	Notes
2014	Hantu Nan Sempit	Tepik	Debut film
2016	Lu Mafia Gua Gangster	Amir	
2017	Tombiruo: Penunggu Rimba	Guide	
2020	Syif Malam Raya	Zaid	
2021	10 Tips Tipu Bini	Zero	
2021	Hantu Bonceng 2.0	Budak Resepi	
2023	Sumpahan Malam Raya	Syawal	

=== Drama ===
Year	Title	Role	TV channel	Notes
2017	Tuyul ke London		Astro Warna	
2022	Roxy	Domi	TV3	

=== Television ===
Year	Title	Role	TV channel	Notes
	Projek Theme Park		Astro Ria	
	Jenaka Kampung Kalut		TV3	
	Temasya Sukan Ke Laut		Astro Warna	
2014	#havocwarna	Lawyer	Astro Warna	
	Onyomat Geset Go	Various	Astro Warna	
	Padan Muka		Astro Warna	
2015	Buana oh Buana	Various	Astro Warna	
2016	Lari Misi Mr. X			
2018	Opera Zero		Astro Warna	
2018	Bintang Bersama Bintang	Guests Picked Up by Participants	TV3	
2019	Senang Terhibur	Pick up guests	TV3	with Arwah Abam Bocey and Aziz Harun
2019	Jom Berbuka	Invited artist	TV3	with Shafeeqa Johari (episode 4)
2019–2022	Jalan-Jalan Makan Angin	Lawyer	TV3	hosting with Akhmal Nazri
2020	Oops Terkena		Astro Warna	Episode 11
2020	Lawak Tak Lagha (season 2)	Lawyer		with Ajak Shiro
2020	Apa Nak Makan ni?		TV3	Episode 19 April
2020	Tak Kot	Invited artist		with Sarah Suhairi
2020	Majestic Johor	Lawyer	Astro Ria	with Fad Bocey
2020	Shuk Nak Tanya		Awesome TV	
2022	Awesome Raja Lawak	Mentor	Awesome TV	
2022	Opocot Next Level	Lawyer	Astro Warna	with Shuib Sepahtu
2022	The Masked Singer Malaysia (season 3)	Jury	Astro Warna	

== Awards ==
Year	Award	Category	Decision
2018	2017 Daily News Popular Star Award	Popular Comedy Artist	Nominated
