= Syaiful Zero =

Malaysian actor and comedian (born 1988)

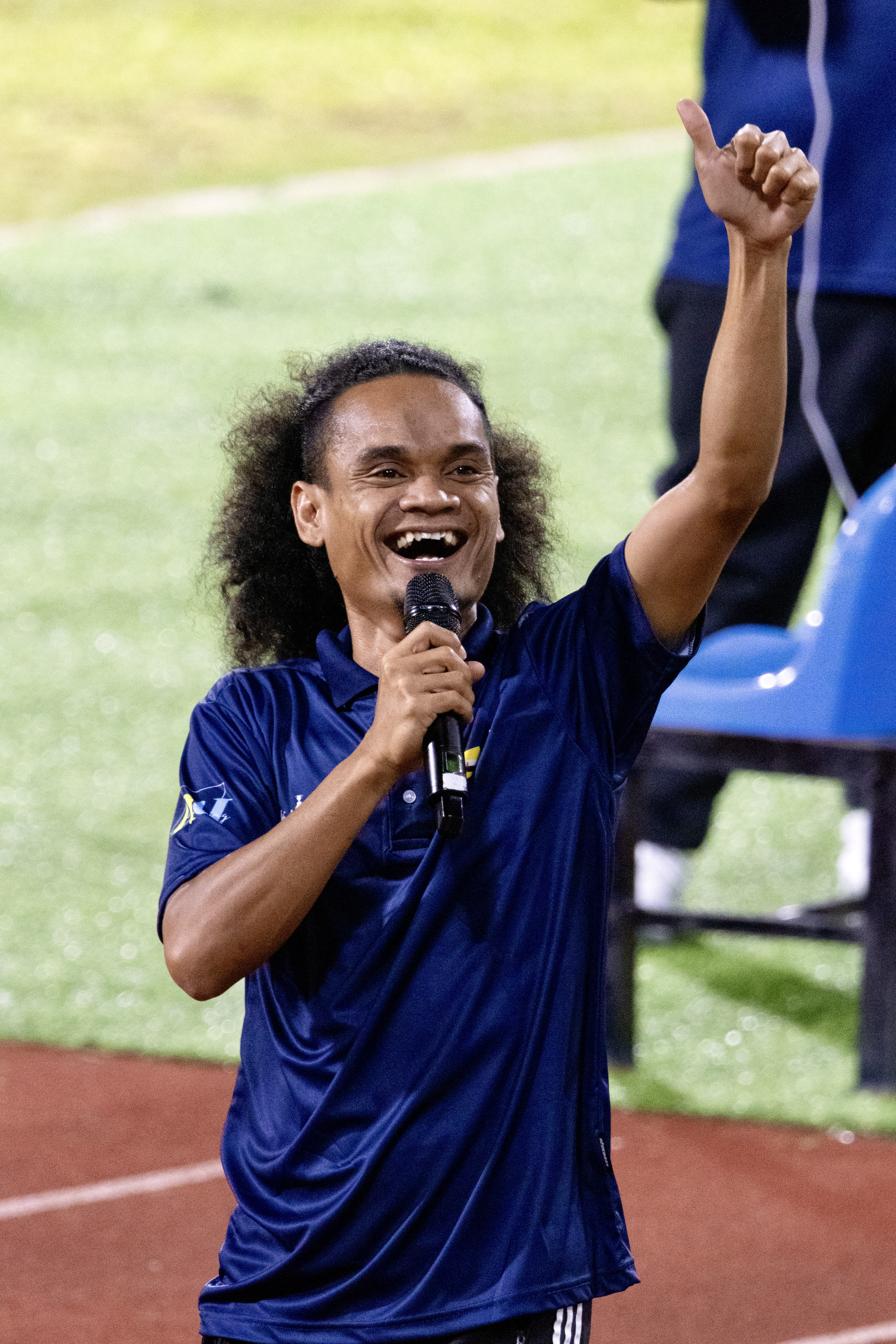
- Syaiful in 2024
- Born: Muhammad Syaiful bin Doli Sharif; 16 December 1988 (age 37); Kudat, Sabah, Malaysia
- Occupations: Actor; comedian
- Years active: 2012–present
- Relatives: Sharif Kunal (brother); Sharif Kadir (brother)

Muhammad Syaiful bin Doli Sharif (born 16 December 1988), commonly known by his stage name Syaiful Zero, is a Malaysian actor and comedian. Due to the feminine roles he adopts, Syaiful was given the nickname Mawar, which means rose.

== Early life ==
The three brothers, Muhammad Syaiful, Sharif Kadir and Sharif Kunal hail from Kudat town in Sabah and are the sons of a traditional fisherman of Bajau descent, Sharif Doli. With just RM$350 in their bank account each month, they had to work hard to support their seven siblings. As the oldest, Syaiful made the decision to leave school at age 13 in order to support his father financially. He said in an interview with InTrend that he felt sorry for his father, who was raising the family alone while his four younger siblings were still in school. He left the school system.

Syaiful began by making around RM$82 per month working in a school canteen. From there, he went on to work as a fisherman for a short while before working at KFC Kudat. In Sabah, employment at KFC was considered glamorous in addition to the higher salary. Later on, he relocated to the metropolis to work at KFC Kota Kinabalu.

== Career ==
Along with his two siblings, Syaiful formed the Zero group, which debuted on stage at the 2012 Gelanggang Awesome Raja Lawak. On 21 October 2012, their father died while sleeping.

Despite their difficult circumstances, the three brothers were fortunate in 2013 to see an advertisement for Astro's reality comedy show Maharaja Lawak Mega (MLM) on television. The group's reputation swiftly increased after that, enabling them to participate in the MLM competition for four seasons, from 2012 to 2018. They also participated in the MLM in 2014 and took home the title in the reality TV competition.

They attempted again the next year but were unable to get to the finals. They took home half a million ringgit after winning the MLM 2014 championship. The Zero group's debut film, Lu Mafia Gua Gangster, was scheduled to premiere in Malaysia on 21 April 2016.

Syaiful and Sharif teamed up in 2023 when they signed up for a reality show Family Duo season 3 (FD3). According to Sharif Kunal, he and his brothers had long-term plans to release a single under the Zero group name. The winnings might be used to write songs by the group. He also said that the music work has actually been planned for a long time—three or four years ago. The two brothers won the title of Best Duo during the first week of the competition, and surprised everyone by ending the fifth week with the highest score. Subsequently, they said that they will give the Palestinian Aid Tube any proceeds from the FD3's reality show.

== Personal life ==
Apart from enjoying themselves with their companions, they participated in other school competitions, such as those that involved religious singing (nasyid) and the playing of the kompang, a customary Malay musical instrument, which they still practice for their presentations.

His brother Sharif Kunal asserted that the brothers' lives haven't altered much since then and that they continue to live according to their same routines despite their success. Not everyone has it easy, he said, so the brothers utilize their money to assist their local friends and family. Not celebrity is what drives them. In actuality, they are able to perform what they do because of all of their assistance.

On 24 July 2015, Syaiful wed Ashura Rudy at Kampong Pantai Bahagia, Kudat. On 5 May 2016, their son, Mohamaad Sharif Isyraq, was born. On 23 December 2019, his wife gave birth to their daughter, Dayang Asyafia, and he was saddened that he was unable to be there. Although his wife is a Filipino citizen, the family has settled in Kudat despite Syaiful's intentions to reside in Kuala Lumpur.

== Filmography ==
Year	Title	Role	Notes
2016	Lu Mafia Gua Gangster	Rosham	Debut film
2018	Tangisan Akinabalu	Petrus	
2020	Syif Malam Raya	Leman	
2021	Jangan Takut: Kau Takut Aku Pun Takut	Orang Minyak	
2022	Hantu Tenggek	Ali	
2022	Zaara	Budi	
2023	Sumpahan Syaitan	John	
