= Fear Factor Malaysia =

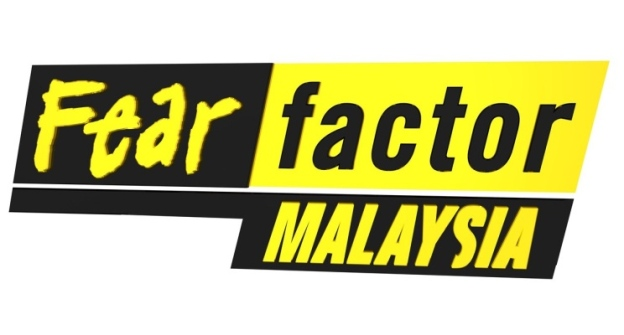
- Fear Factor Malaysia logo
- Created by: Endemol
- Presented by: Shamser Sidhu (Fear Factor Malaysia); Aaron Aziz (Fear Factor Selebriti Malaysia)
- Country of origin: Malaysia
- Original languages: Mainly Malay, previously English
- No. of seasons: 3

Production
- Executive producer: Iris Chia (Season 2-3)
- Production locations: Kuala Lumpur (Season 1); South Africa (Celebrity edition)
- Running time: 30-45 minutes

Original release
- Network: AXN; NTV7; Astro Ria; Astro Maya HD; Astro Mustika HD
- Release: August 27, 2005 – 2014

Fear Factor Malaysia is a Malaysian adaptation of the American TV show Fear Factor. The original network to carry this format originally is NTV7 on 27 August 2005. The series was first launched as Fear Factor Malaysia on NTV7 in 2005. However, the channel discontinued the series after 7 years. The series was relaunched as Fear Factor Selebriti Malaysia on 29 December 2012.

== Host ==
The first season of Fear Factor Malaysia was hosted by Shamser Sidhu in 2005. After it was relaunched in 2012, Fear Factor Celebrity Malaysia was hosted by actor Aaron Aziz.

== Season 1 ==
The first season was launched in 2005 featuring host Shamser Sidhu. The show was filmed in the capital city of Malaysia, Kuala Lumpur. Six contestants was chosen for the first season to compete for the prize of RM10,000.

=== Contestants ===
Six contestants were chosen. Note that the ages displayed were taken during the show's taping in 2005.

Contestants	Age	Hometown	Occupation
David Lim	38	Kuala Lumpur	Architect
Dinesh Aravindhakshan	25	Kuala Lumpur	Navigation Officer
Dasrul Haflan Mohd Dahlan	26	Perak	Finance Consultant
Shalini Devi	24	Kuala Lumpur	Accountant
Too Sze Yung	22	Penang	Unemployed
Nor Sre Dewe Abd Aziz	26	Melaka	Personal trainer

=== Elimination chart ===
Contestants	Episodes																	
Contestants	1			2			3			4			5			6		
Dinesh	3rd	3rd	1st	2nd	3rd	1st	1st	3rd	3rd	4th	4th	3rd	1st	3rd	1st	1st	2nd	1st
Sre Dewe	5th	1st	4th	5th	1st	5th	2nd	2nd	1st	3rd	3rd	1st	3rd	2nd	2nd	2nd	1st	2nd
David	2nd	2nd	2nd	3rd	6th	2nd	5th	5th	2nd	1st	1st	2nd	2nd	1st	3rd			
Dasrul	1st	4th	3rd	6th	2nd	3rd	4th	4th	4th	2nd	2nd	4th						
Shalini	4th	5th	5th	1st	4th	4th	3rd	1st	5th									
Too	6th	6th	6th	4th	5th	6th												

== Season 2 (Celebrity Edition) ==
The Fear Factor Malaysia is back for the second time after six years of disappearance. The Fear Factor Selebriti Malaysia was hosted by actor, Aaron Aziz. The Fear Factor Selebriti Malaysia was won by team Dazrin & Hairul.

=== Format ===
The name Fear Factor Malaysia was changed to Fear Factor Selebriti Malaysia which features 30 celebrities from different occupation and was later paired into a team of two which later make 15 teams.

=== Prize ===
The winner of Fear Factor Selebriti Malaysia will receive a cash prize of RM200,000. An additional RM10,000 will be given each week to the best overall performer of the week.

=== Location ===
The second season was filmed in Cape Town, South Africa.

=== Challenge ===
The 15 teams will be facing 25 challenges during the whole season. The weakest team will be sent home.

=== Contestants ===
The contestants consisted of celebrities. Note that the ages displayed were taken during the show's taping in 2012.

Contestants	Age	Hometown	Occupation
Afiq "Akim" Ahmad	21	Johor	Actor & Singer
Ajak Shiro	27	Johor	Comedian
Alam Wakaka Crew	26	Kuala Lumpur	Dancer
Alif Hadi	24	Pahang	Host & TV personality
Arja Lee	27	Kuala Lumpur	Actor
Arthur Tan	28	Kuala Lumpur	TV personality
Quentin Cheng	13	Johor	Footballer
Azam Pitt	24	Kuala Lumpur	Actor
Azline "Ezlynn" binti Ariffin	31	Perak	Actress & Singer
Azri Abdullah	25	Kuala Lumpur	Singer
Celina Khor	28	Kelantan	Chef & TV personality
Dazrin Kamarudin	24	Melaka	Actor
Didie Alias	39	Melaka	Actress & Comedian
Nurul Elfira Loy	18	Kuala Lumpur	Actress & Model
Farish Aziz	28	Kota Kinabalu	Actor, TV personality, Host & Radio DJ
Gadaffi "Dafi" Ismail Sabri	24	Kuala Lumpur	Actor & Singer
Hafizul Kamal	27	Kelantan	Actor & TV personality
Hairul Azreen	24	Kuala Lumpur	Actor
Hefny Sahad	25	Kuala Lumpur	Actor & TV personality
Isham Shahruddin	36	Perak	Ex-footballer
Jehan Miskin	33	Penang	Actor
Johan As'ari	26	Penang	Actor
Kairullah "Iz" Ezuan Sulaini	30	Kelantan	Singer
Kaka Azraff	23	Negeri Sembilan	Musical Artist & Singer
Mejar Dr. Faiz Khaleed	34	Kuala Lumpur	Astronaut & Dentist
Mohd Hairey "Zoey" Abd Rahman	27	Kuala Lumpur	TV personality
Nik Michael Imran	23	Australia	Celebrity chef
Roslan Shah	41	Selangor	Entertainer
Saifullah "Gambit" bin Rosli	27	Terengganu	Actor
Zawen Anwar	31	Kuala Lumpur	Model

=== Partners ===
The contestants were later paired up with their chosen partners.

Partners
Ajak & Elfira
Aliff & Gambit
Arja Lee & Alam
Arthur & Celina
Azri & Atu Zero
Dafi & Zoey
Dazrin & Hairul
Didie & Isham
Ezlynn & Nik Michael
Farish & Akim
Hefny & Hafizul
Iz & Zawen
Jehan & Dr. Faiz
Johan & Kaka
Roslan & Azam Pitt

=== Elimination Chart ===
No	Partners	Episodes																							
No	Partners	1	2	3		4		5		6		7		8		9		10		11		12		13	
1	Hairul & Dazrin	HIGH	WIN	IN	IN	IN	IN	IN	IN	HIGH	IMM	IN	WIN	IN	LOW	HIGH	IMM	IN	IN	IN	IN	IN	IN	IN	WINNER
2	Hefny & Hafizul	HIGH	IN	IN	IN	IN	HIGH	IN	IN	IN	IMM	IN	IN	IN	WIN	IN	HIGH	HIGH	IMM	IN	LOW	WIN	IN	IN	RUNNER-UP
3	Dafi & Zoey	WIN	IN	IN	IN	IN	IN	IN	IN	HIGH	HIGH	HIGH	IN	IN	IN	WIN	IMM	IN	WIN	IN	HIGH	HIGH	WIN	ELIM	
4	Ajak & Elfira	IN	IN	IN	IN	WIN	IMM	IN	IN	HIGH	IMM	WIN	HIGH	WIN	IMM	IN	LOW	WIN	IMM	IN	WIN	IN	SAFE	ELIM	
5	Akim & Farish	IN	IN	HIGH	IMM	HIGH	IN	WIN	IMM	IN	IN	IN	IN	IN	IN	HIGH	LOW	IN	IN	IN	ELIM				
6	Arja Lee & Alam	IN	IN	HIGH	IMM	IN	IN	IN	IN	WIN	WIN	IN	IN	IN	IN	IN	WIN	IN	IN	ELIM					
7	Johan & Kaka	IN	LOW	IN	IN	HIGH	IMM	IN	WIN	HIGH	IN	LOW	IN	IN	IN	IN	HIGH	IN	ELIM						
8	Aliff & Gambit	IN	IN	WIN	IMM	IN	IN	IN	IN	IN	LOW	IN	SAFE	IN	IN	IN	ELIM								
9	Ezlynn & Nik Michael	IN	IN	IN	IN	IN	IMM	IN	IN	IN	IN	IN	IN	IN	ELIM										
10	Azri & Atu Zero	IN	IN	LOW	IN	IN	WIN	IN	IN	IN	ELIM														
11	Iz & Zawen	IN	IN	IN	IN	IN	IN	IN	WDR																
12	Jehan & Faiz	HIGH	IN	LOW	IN	IN	OUT																		
13	Arthur & Celina	IN	WIN	LOW	ELIM																				
14	Didie & Isham	HIGH	ELIM																						
15	Azam & Roslan	ELIM																							

Gold background and WINNER means the partners won Fear Factor Selebriti Malaysia.
Silver background and RUNNER-UP means the partners was the runner-up on Fear Factor Selebriti Malaysia.
Green background and WIN means the partners was the best overall performance and won RM10,000 for that week.
Purple background and WIN means the partners was the winner in the Fear Factor challenge.
Blue background and HIGH means the partners was on the top chart in that week.
Orange background and LOW mean the partners worst challenge but safe.
Dark Yellow background and WDR mean partners withdrew due to injuries.
Pink background and SAFE mean the partners were originally eliminated but was saved.
Red background and ELIM means the partners lost and was eliminated of the competition.

== Season 3 (Celebrity Edition S2) ==
The second season of Fear Factor Selebriti Malaysia is back in 2014. The show was once again hosted by fellow actor, Aaron Aziz.

=== Format ===
This season features 32 contestants with 16 celebrities and 16 fans from around Malaysia. They were then paired a team of two with one celebrity and one fan.

=== Prize ===
The winner of Fear Factor Selebriti Malaysia will receive a cash prize of RM200,000.

=== Location ===
The third season was filmed once again in Cape Town, South Africa.

=== Challenge ===
The 16 teams will be facing 28 challenges during the whole season. The weakest team will be sent home.

=== Contestants ===
The contestants consisted of celebrities and fans. Note that the ages displayed were taken during the show's taping in 2014.

Contestants	Age	Occupation
Dira & Azura	29	Actor
Dira & Azura	19	Customer Service Officer
Izzue & Emri	23	Actor & Singer
Izzue & Emri	29	Sales Advisor
Shah & Kartini	30	Actor & Model
Shah & Kartini	20	Student
Shuib & Zakaria	29	Comedian
Shuib & Zakaria	26	Unemployed
Joy & Thanuja	28	Instructor
Joy & Thanuja	29	Beauty queen & Model
Yana & Janice	29	Actress
Yana & Janice	24	Businesswomen
Zain & Faisal	29	Actor & Model
Zain & Faisal	28	Technical officer
Norman & Zarina	27	Actor
Norman & Zarina	49	Actress
Redha & Erin	25	Customer Service Officer
Redha & Erin	19	Actress
Khairul & Nas-T	36	Telecom officer
Khairul & Nas-T	30	Radio DJ & Model
Ryzal & Samsuri	31	Actor
Ryzal & Samsuri	32	Finance officer
Anbia & Sari	24	Student
Anbia & Sari	29	Actress
Syed & Tatt	28	Actor
Syed & Tatt	24	Graduates
Ungku & Fify	28	Director
Ungku & Fify	23	Model
Rachel & Azura	28	Instructor
Rachel & Azura	32	Host
Bambang & Akmal	32	Model
Bambang & Akmal	28	Doctor

=== Elimination chart ===
No	Partners	Episodes															
No	Partners	1	2	3	4	5	6	7	8	9	10	11	12	13	14	15	16

== See also ==
- Fear Factor
