= Fanous =

Traditional lantern widely associated with Ramadan

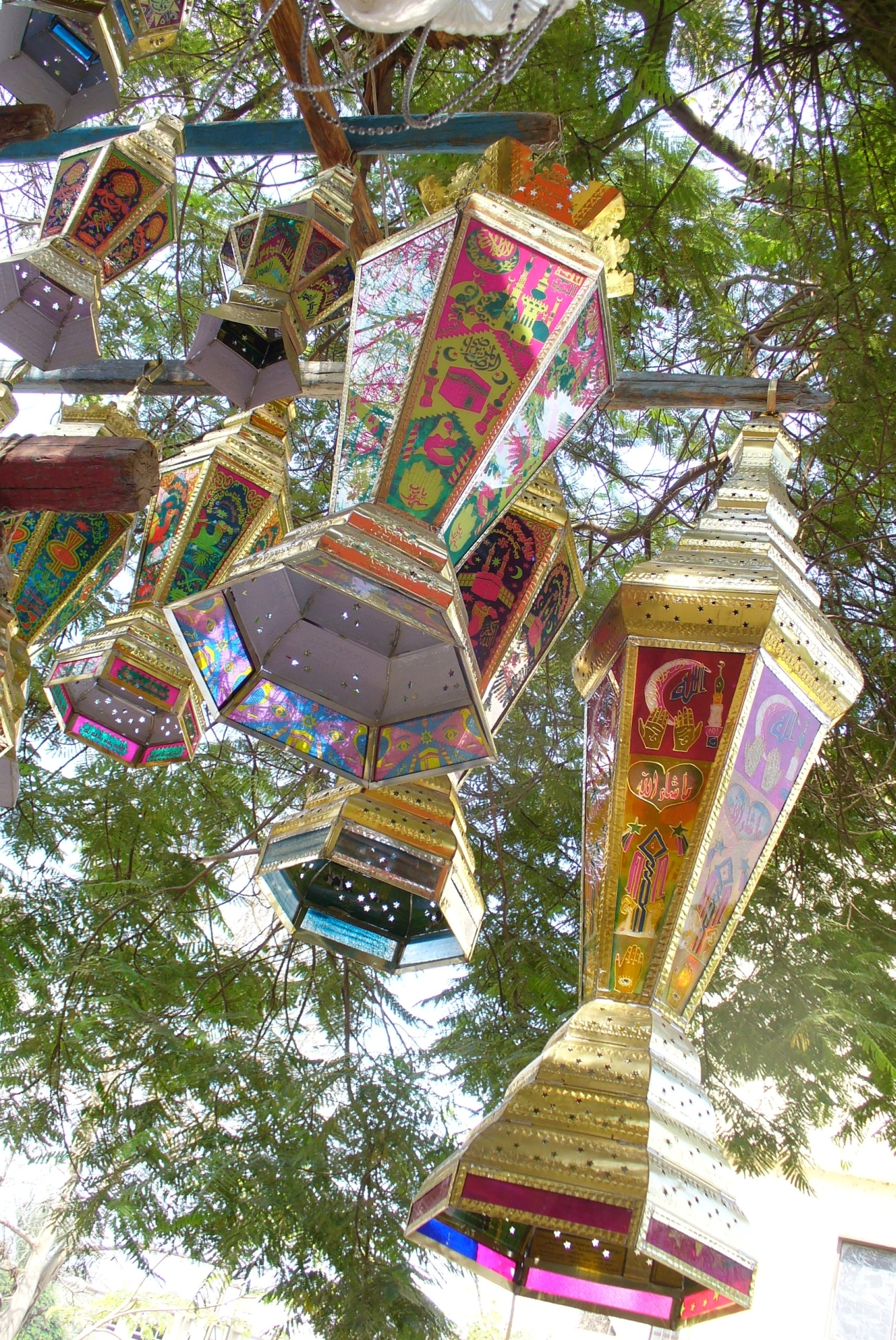
Traditional Egyptian fanous lanterns in Cairo, Egypt, celebrating Ramadan

Fanous or Fanoos (Arabic: فانوس IPA: [fæˈnuːs], pl. فوانيس [fæwæˈniːs]), also widely known as Fanous Ramadan (Arabic: فانوس رمضان), is an Egyptian folk and traditional lantern used to decorate streets and homes in the month of Ramadan. With its origins in Egypt, it has since spread across the Muslim world and is a common symbol associated with the holy month.

== Etymology ==
The word "Fanous" (also spelled Fanos, Phanous and Fanoos) is a term originating from Greek φανός, phanós. It means 'light' or 'lantern'. It was historically used in its meaning of "the light of the world," and is a symbol of hope, as in "light in the darkness".

== History ==
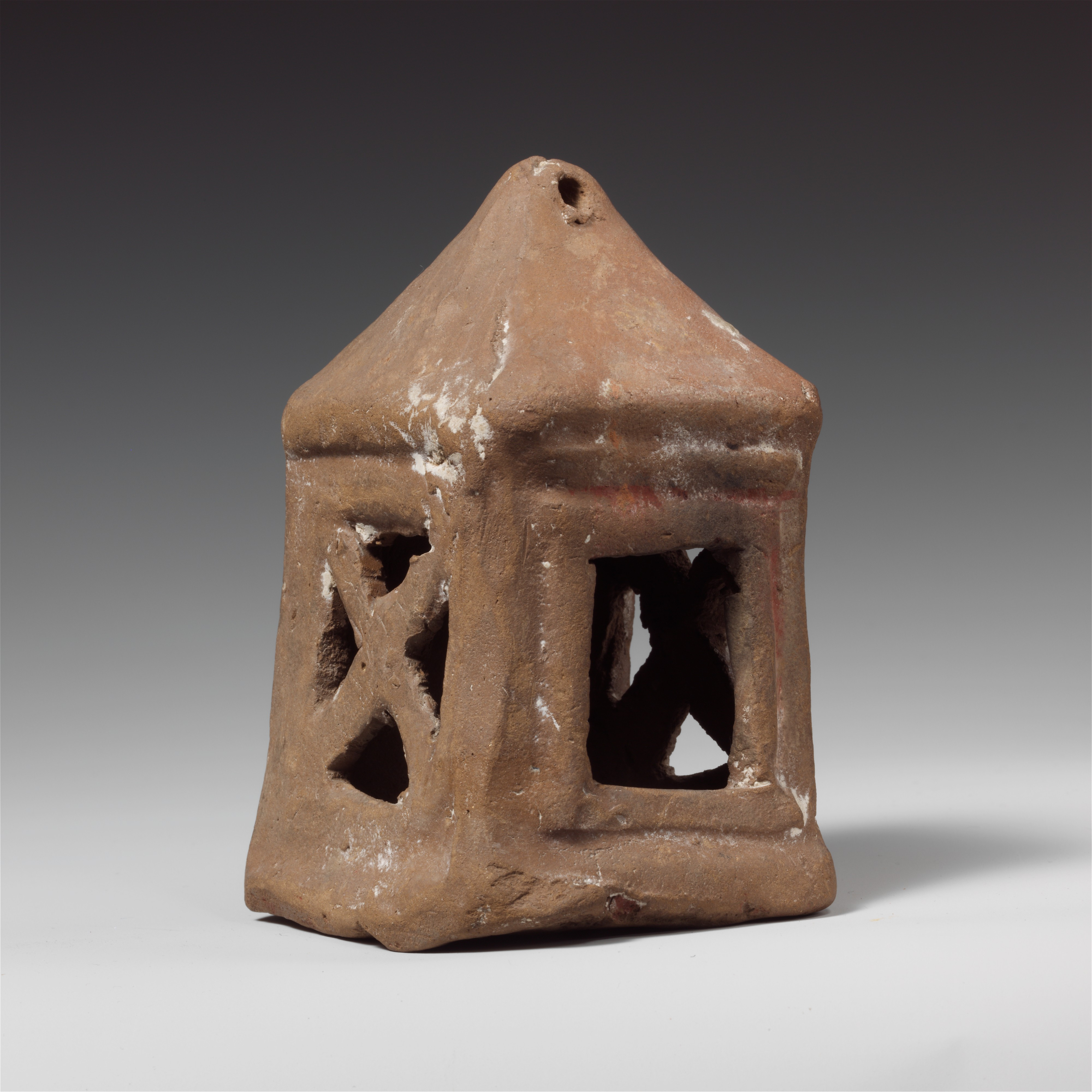
Egyptian Lamp enclosed in shrine. 2nd century A.D., Middle Egypt

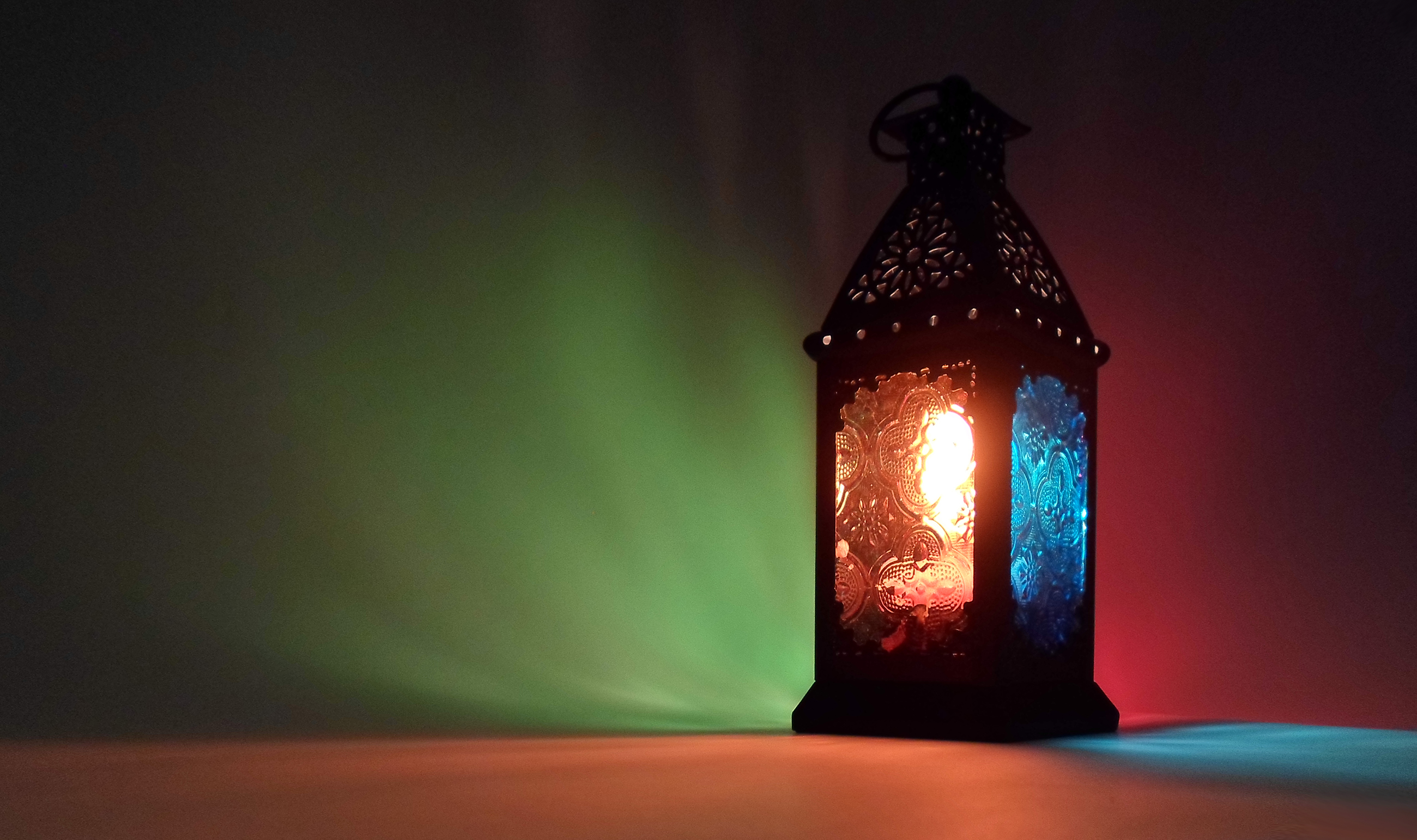
Old Fanous Ramadan from Egypt

The traditional use of fanous as decorations associated with Ramadan comes from Medieval Egypt, as it is said that the Egyptian people came out in masses holding lanterns to welcome the Fatimid Caliph Al-Muizz's arrival in Cairo during the holy month of Ramadan, as it was ancient tradition in Egypt to celebrate by lighting the streets with fanous lanterns. Its use has now spread to many Muslim countries.

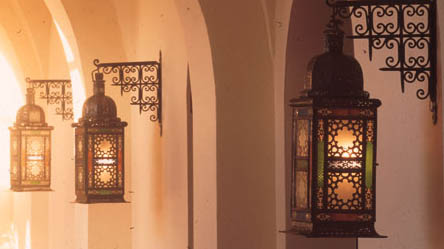
Fanous

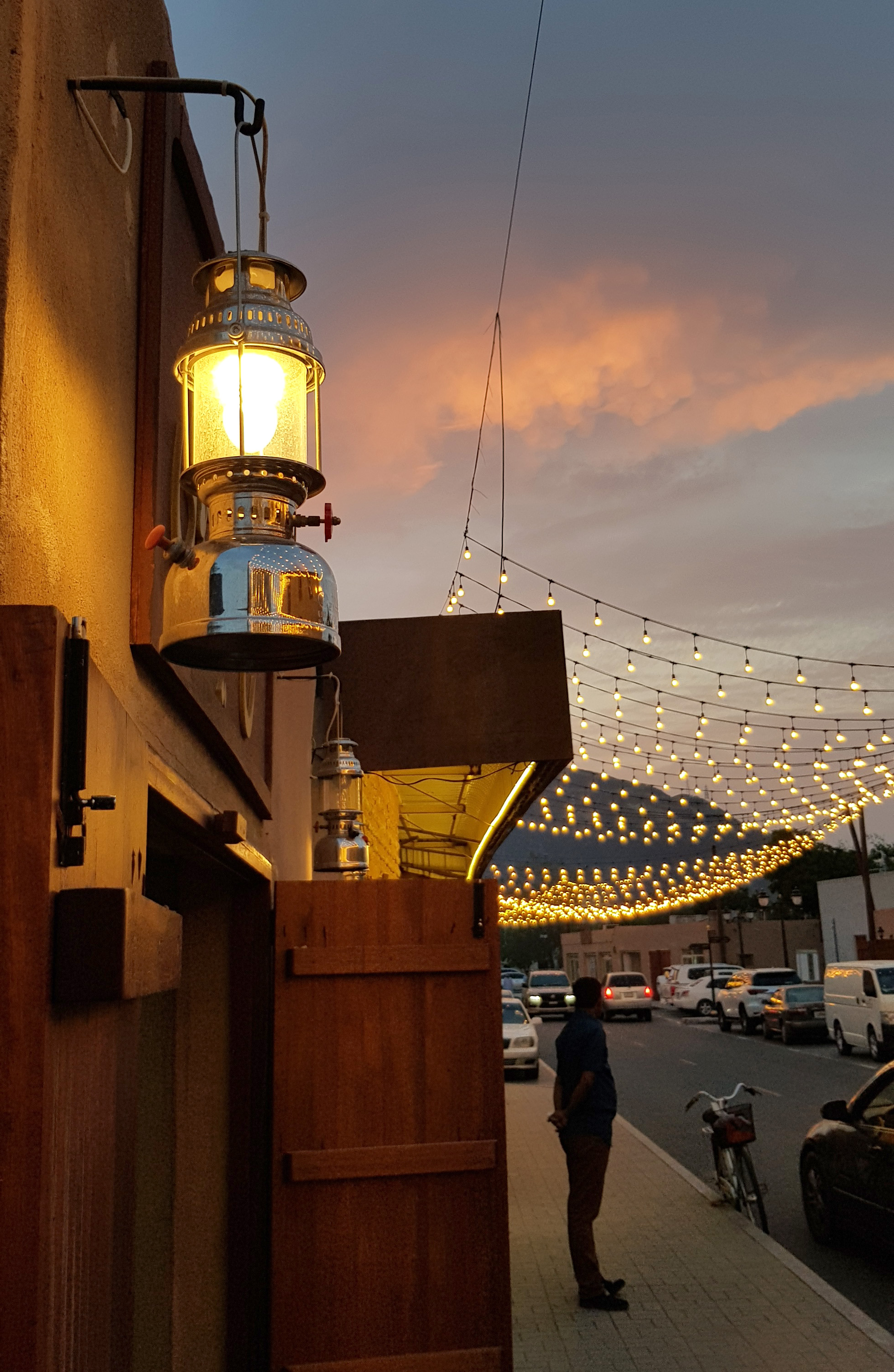
Fanous

In ancient times it was similar to a lamp, and would have incorporated either candles or oil. The fanous was originally developed from the torches used in Pharaonic festivals celebrating the rising of the star Sirius. For five days, the Ancient Egyptians celebrated the birthdays of Osiris, Horus, Isis, Seth and Nephtys—one on each day—by lighting the streets with the fanous (torches). Torches or candles were also used in early Christianity, which is recorded by Egyptian historian Al-Maqrizi (1364–1442), who noted in his book, "Al Mawaiz wa al-'i'tibar bi dhikr al-khitat wa al-'athar", that these torches or candles were used during Christmastime for celebration.

== Use ==
Fanous is widely used all over the world – especially in Asian regions and the Arab world – not just for specific religious purposes but also as decoration or as a name. They can be found in houses, restaurants, hotels, malls, etc. Often arranged as a grouping of lights varying in design and shape. Metal and glass are mostly used for their construction.
