= Syaiful Lewenusa =

Indonesian footballer

Personal information
- Full name: Syaiful A.A. Lewenussa
- Date of birth: 13 June 1986 (age 40)
- Place of birth: Masohi, Indonesia
- Height: 1.69 m (5 ft 6 1/2 in)
- Position: Left back

Senior career*
Years	Team	Apps	(Gls)
2008	PSP Padang		
2008–2011	Persisam Putra	74	(0)
2011–2012	Persiba Balikpapan	25	(1)
2012–2013	Persela Lamongan	36	(0)
2013–2014	Persikabo Bogor	17	(0)
2014	Persiram Raja Ampat	8	(0)
2015–2016	Pusamania Borneo	0	(0)
2016–2018	PSCS Cilacap	38	(0)
- * Club domestic league appearances and goals as of 11 July 2012

Syaiful Lewenusa (born 13 June 1986 in Masohi, Seram, Central Maluku Regency) is an Indonesian former footballer.

== Club statistics ==
Club	Season	Super League		Premier Division		Piala Indonesia		Total	
Club	Season	Apps	Goals	Apps	Goals	Apps	Goals	Apps	Goals
Persisam Putra	2009–10	28	0	-		-		28	0
Persisam Putra	2010–11	26	0	-		-		26	0
Persiba Balikpapan	2011–12	25	1	-		-		25	1
Total		79	1	-		-		79	1

== Hounors ==
=== Clubs ===
- Persisam Putra Samarinda :
  - Liga Indonesia Premier Division champions : 1 (2008-09)
