= Ramadan =

Ninth month of the Islamic calendar and month-long fasting event in Islam

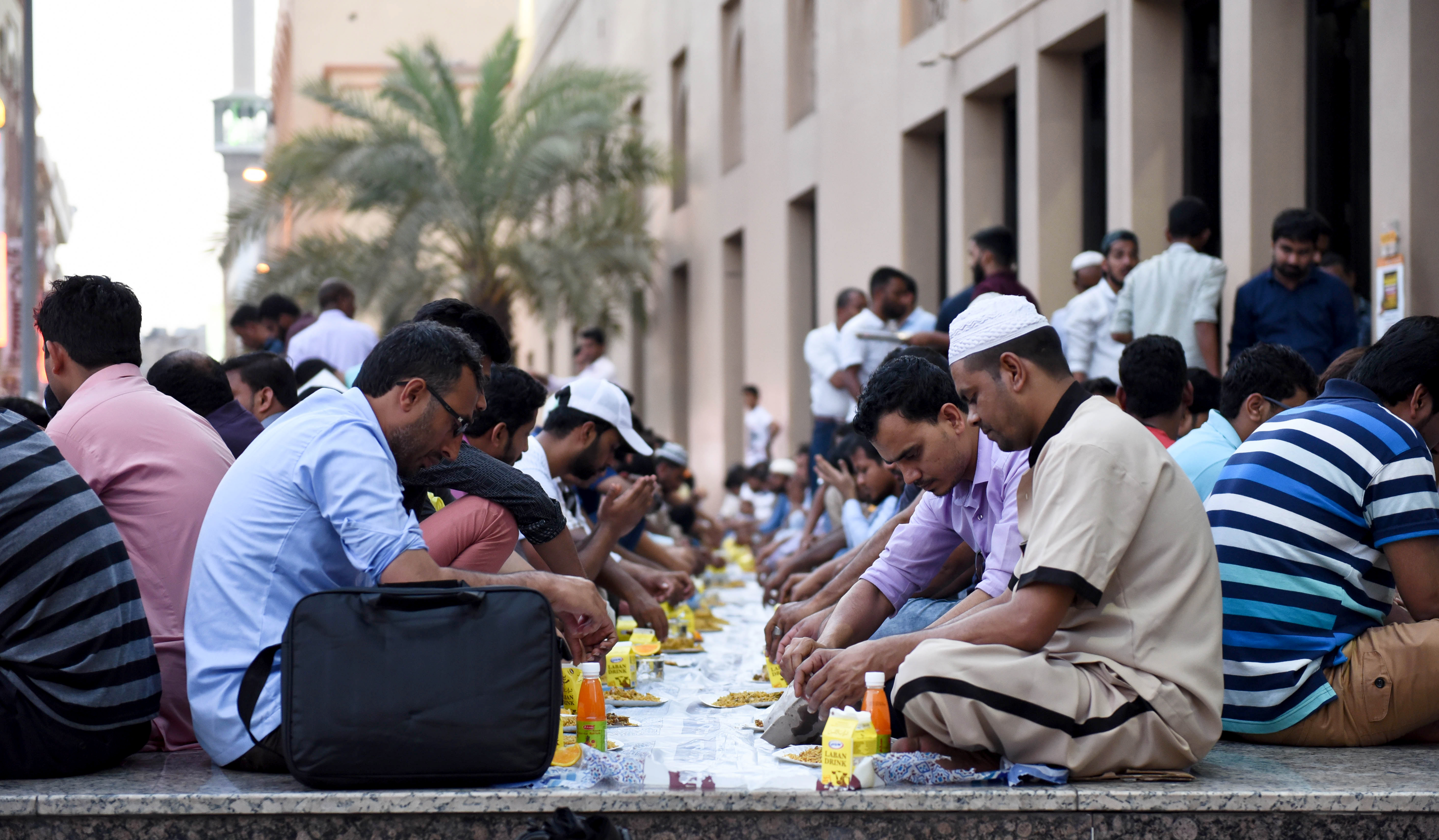
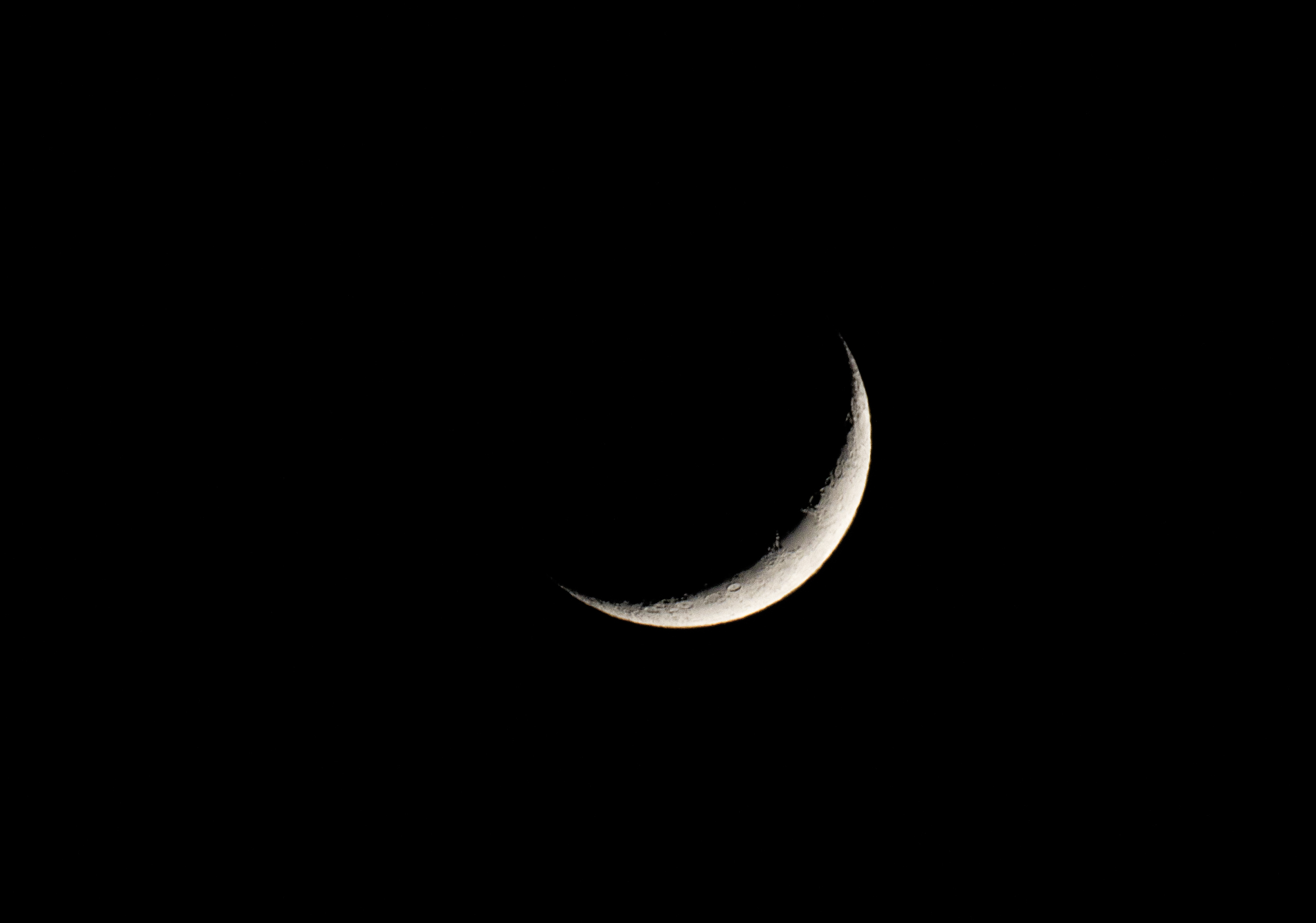
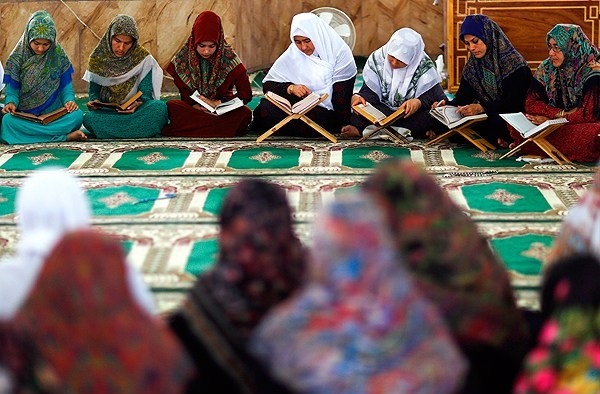
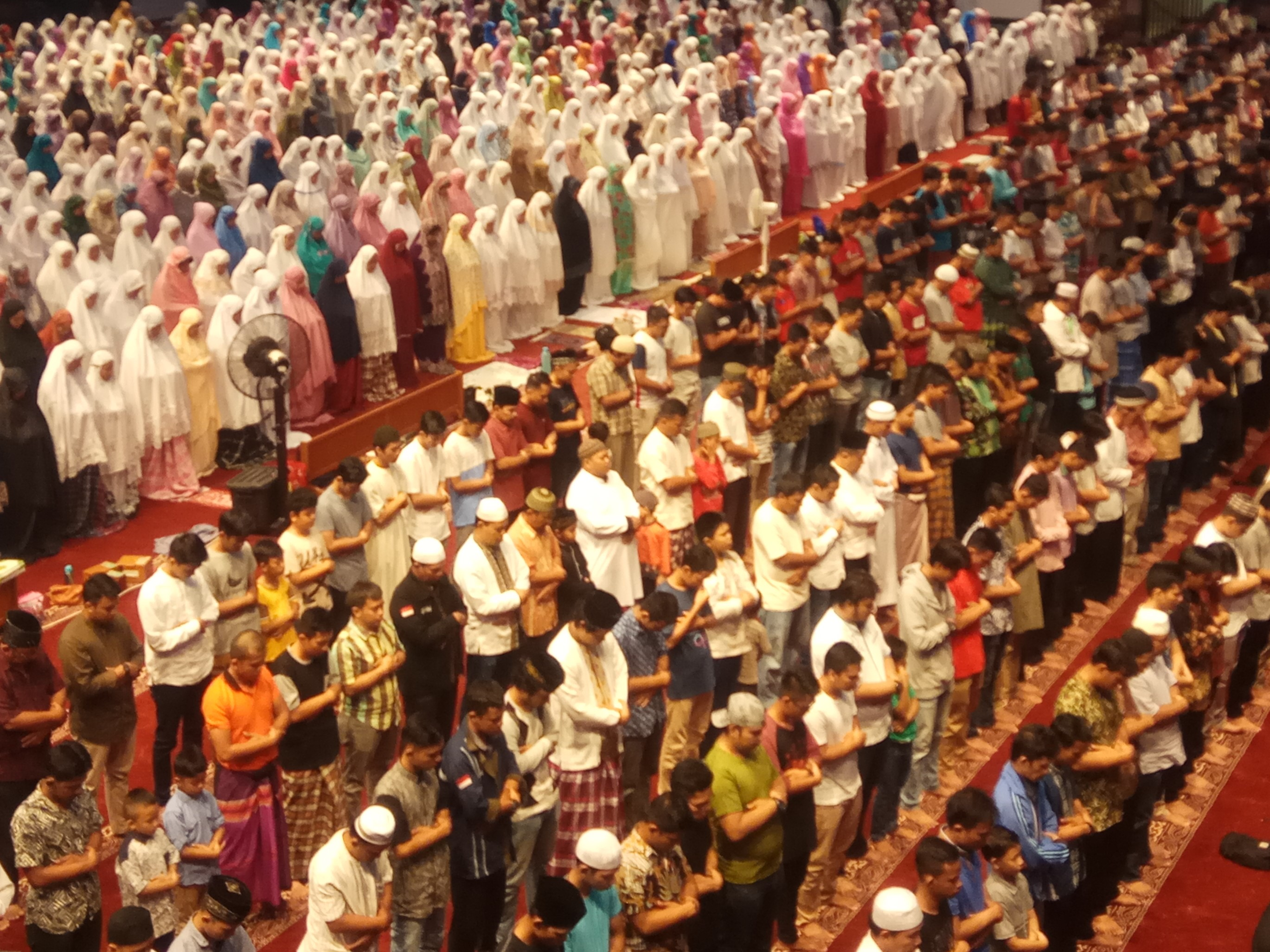
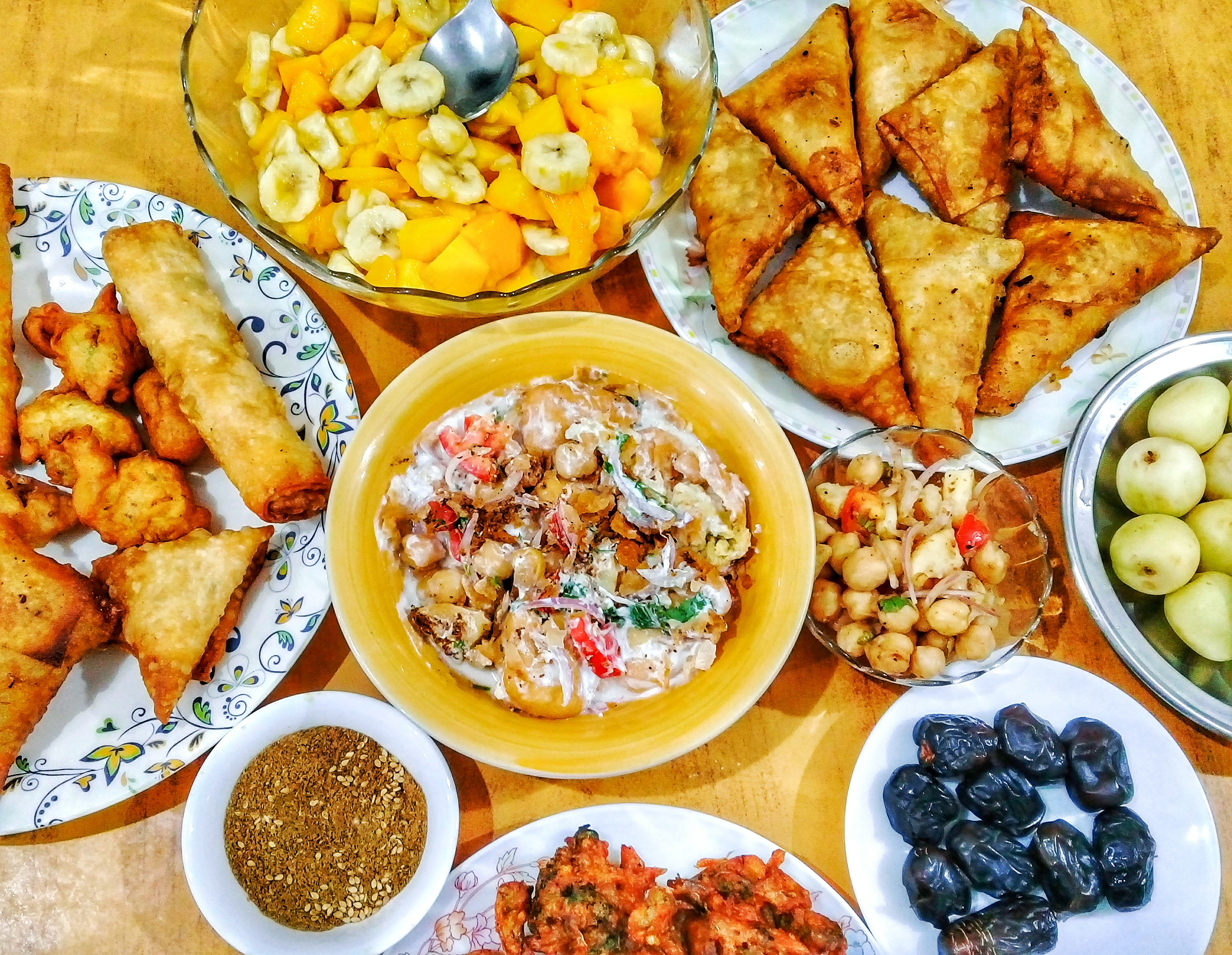
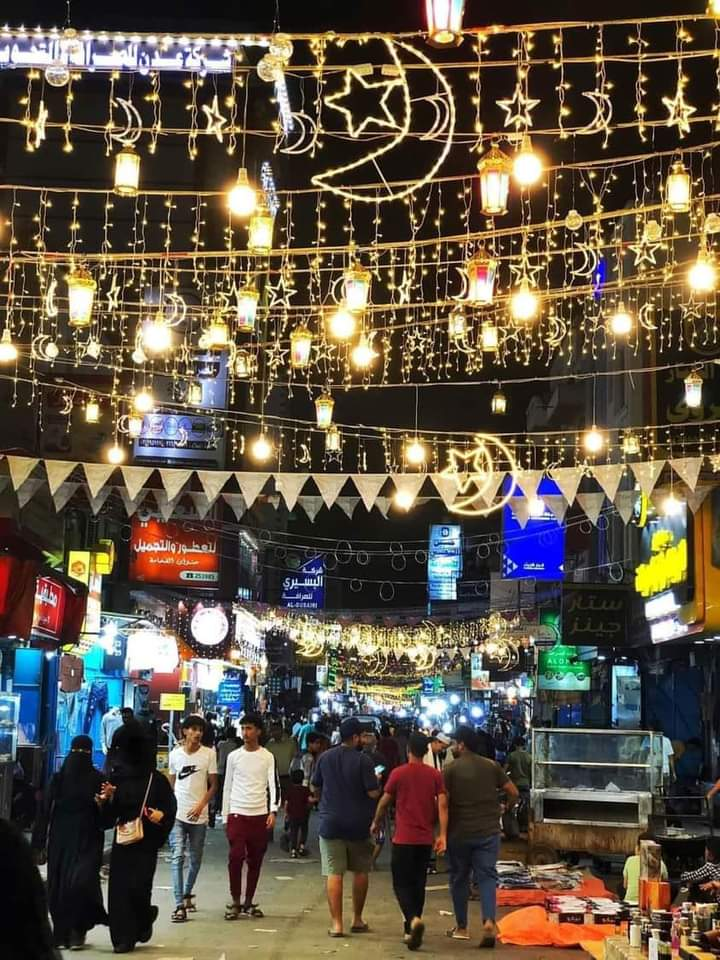
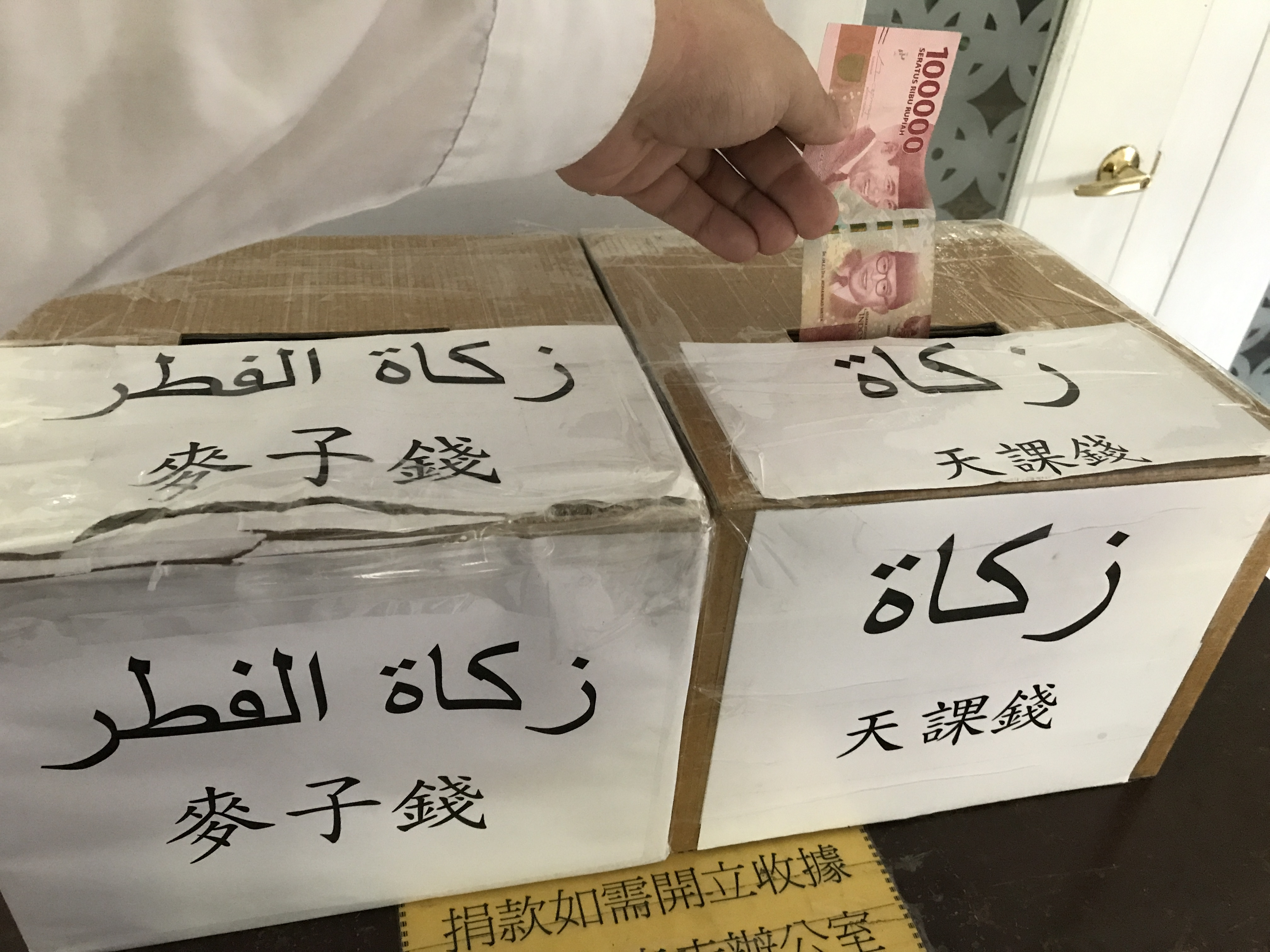
- Men breaking their fast during iftar in Dubai's Grand Mosque A crescent moon over Sarıçam, Turkey Women reading the Quran in Bandar Torkaman, Iran Tarawih prayers at a mosque in Padang, Indonesia Iftar meal Ramadan decorations in the streets of Aden, Yemen Zakat donation boxes in Taipei, Taiwan
- Calendar: Islamic calendar
- Month number: 9
- Number of days: 29–30 (depends on actual observation of the moon's crescent)
- Significant days: Al-'Ashr al-Awakher; Laylat al-Qadr; Jumu'atul-Wida; Laylat al-Jaiza

Ramadan (Note: English: /ˌræməˈdɑːn/, also US: /ˌrɑːm-, ˈræmədɑːn, ˈrɑːm-/, UK: /ˈræmədæn/. Also spelled Ramazan, Ramzan, Ramadhan, or Ramathan.) (Note: Arabic: رَمَضَان, romanized: Ramaḍān [ra.ma.dˤaːn]. According to Arabic phonology, it can be realized as [rɑmɑˈdˤɑːn, ramaˈdˤɑːn, ræmæˈdˤɑːn], depending on the region.) is the ninth month of the Islamic calendar. It is observed by Muslims worldwide as a month of fasting (sawm), communal prayer (salah), reflection, study of the Quran, charity, and strengthening community ties. It is also the month in which the Quran is believed to have been revealed to the Islamic prophet Muhammad, known as Laylat al-Qadr. The annual observance of Ramadan is regarded as one of the five pillars of Islam and lasts 29 to 30 days, from one sighting of the crescent moon to the next.

Fasting from dawn to sunset is obligatory (fard) for all Muslims who have reached puberty, and who are not acutely or chronically ill, traveling, elderly, breastfeeding, pregnant, or menstruating. The predawn meal is suhur, and the nightly feast that breaks the fast is iftar. Although rulings (fatawa) have been issued that Muslims who live in regions with a midnight sun or polar night should follow the timetable of Mecca, it is common practice to follow the timetable of the closest country in which night can be distinguished from day.

The spiritual rewards (thawab) of fasting are believed to be multiplied during Ramadan. Accordingly, during the hours of fasting, Muslims refrain not only from food and drink, but also from all behavior deemed to be sinful in Islam.

== Etymology ==
The word Ramadan derives from Arabic رمضان (ramaḍān), itself derived from the Arabic root ر م ض (R M Ḍ) related to 'scorching heat', which corresponds to the Classical Arabic verb رَمِضَ (ramiḍa) meaning 'to become intensely hot, to become burning; to become scorching; to be blazing; to be glowing'.

Ramadan is thought of as one of the names of God in Islam by some. Many hadiths say it is prohibited to say only "Ramadan" in reference to the calendar month and that it is necessary to say "month of Ramadan", as reported in Sunni, Shia and Zaydi sources. Others consider this Mawḍūʻ (fabricated) and inauthentic.

In the Persian language, the Arabic letter ض (ḍād) is pronounced /z/. Muslim communities in some countries with historical Persian influence, such as Afghanistan, Azerbaijan, Bosnia and Herzegovina, Iran, India, Pakistan, and Turkey, use the word Ramazan or Ramzan. The word Romzan is used in Bangladesh.

== History ==
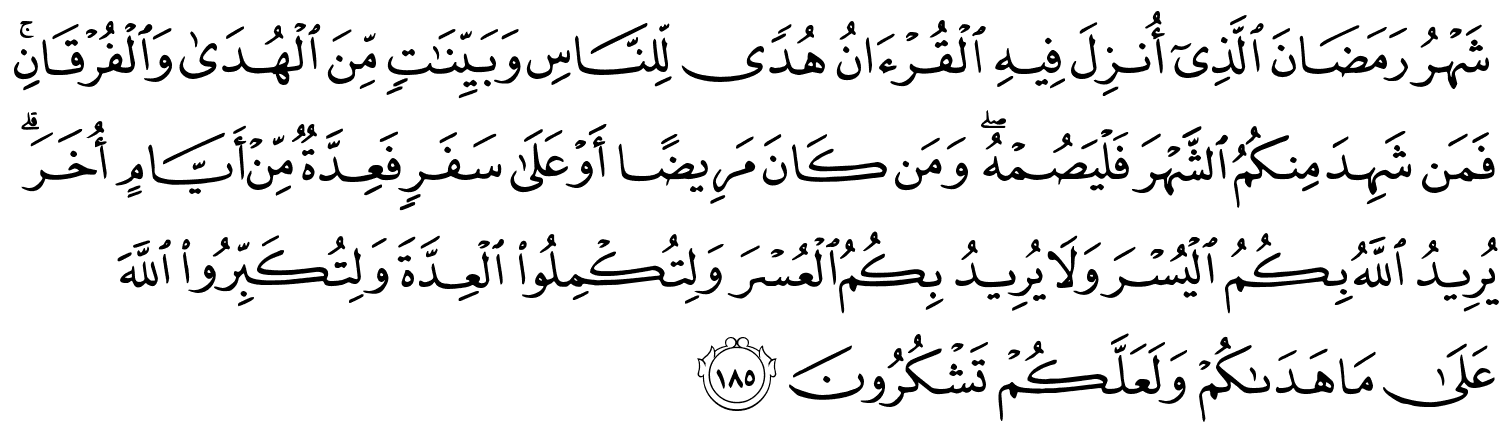
Chapter 2, Verse 185 in Arabic

Ramadan is the month on which the Quran was revealed as a guide for humanity with clear proofs of guidance and the standard ˹to distinguish between right and wrong˺. So whoever is present this month, let them fast. But whoever is ill or on a journey, then ˹let them fast˺ an equal number of days ˹after Ramaḍân˺. Allah intends ease for you, not hardship, so that you may complete the prescribed period and proclaim the greatness of Allah for guiding you, and perhaps you will be grateful.

— Surah Al-Baqara 2:185

Muslims hold that all scriptures were revealed during Ramadan, the scrolls of Abraham, Torah, Psalms, Gospel, and Quran having been handed down during that month. Muhammad is said to have received his first quranic revelation on Laylat al-Qadr, one of five odd-numbered nights during the last ten days of Ramadan.

Although Muslims were first commanded to fast in the second year of Hijra (624 CE), they believe that the practice of fasting is not in fact an innovation of monotheism but rather has always been necessary for believers to attain fear of God (taqwa).^{[Quran 2:183]} They point to the fact that pre-Islamic pagans in Mecca fasted on the tenth day of Muharram to expiate sin and avoid drought. Philip Jenkins argues that the observance of Ramadan fasting grew out of "the strict Lenten discipline of the Syrian Churches", a postulation corroborated by other scholars, including theologian Paul-Gordon Chandler, but disputed by some Muslim academics. The Quran itself emphasizes that the fast it prescribes had already been prescribed to earlier biblical communities (2:183), though there is no explicit intertext for this pre-Islamic practice.

== Important dates ==
The Islamic calendar is lunar; each month begins when the first crescent of a new moon is sighted. The Islamic year consists of 12 lunar cycles and is 10 to 11 days shorter than the solar year. As the Islamic calendar does not use intercalation, (Note: A tropical year is almost the same length as a year in the Western Gregorian Calendar. The difference is imperceptible in a human lifespan.) Ramadan migrates throughout the seasons. The Islamic day starts after sunset. The estimated start and end dates for Ramadan, based on the Umm al-Qura calendar of Saudi Arabia, are:

Ramadan dates between 2024 and 2028
AH	First day (CE/AD)	Last day (CE/AD)
1445	11 March 2024	9 April 2024
1446	1 March 2025	29 March 2025
1447	18 February 2026	19 March 2026
1448	8 February 2027	8 March 2027
1449	28 January 2028	25 February 2028

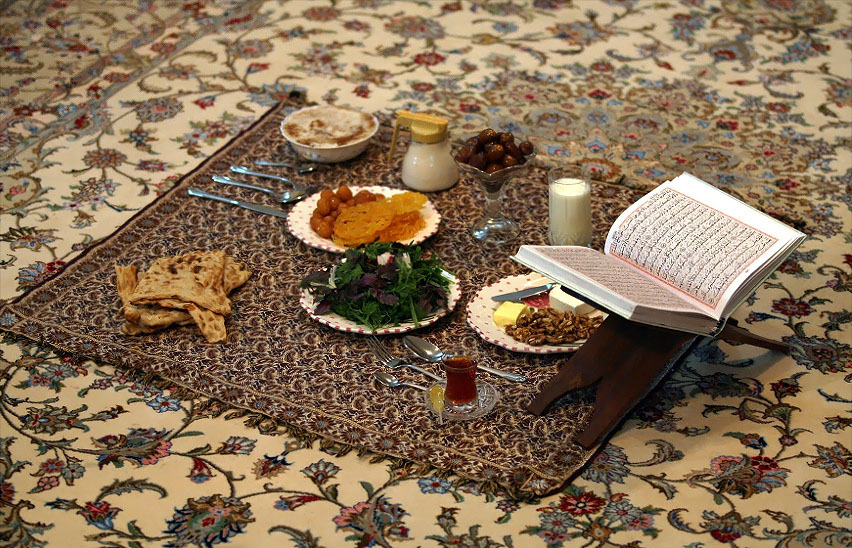
An iftar meal

Many Muslims insist on the local physical sighting of the moon to mark the beginning of Ramadan, but others use the calculated time of the new moon or the Saudi Arabian declaration to determine the start of the month. Since the new moon is not in the same state at the same time globally, Ramadan's beginning and ending depend on what lunar sightings are received in each location. As a result, Ramadan dates vary in different countries, but usually by only a day. This is due to the cycles of the moon; the moon may not qualify as a waxing crescent, which delineates the change in months, at sundown in one location but later meet it in another location. Astronomical projections that approximate the start of Ramadan are available.

In Shia Islam, one of the special dates of this month is the day of the assassination of Ali, the fourth Rashidun caliph and the first Shia Imam. Ali was struck during morning prayer on the 19th day of Ramadan, 40 AH, and died on the 21st day of the month. Shi'ites engage in mourning and prayer on these nights, especially in Iran.

=== Beginning ===
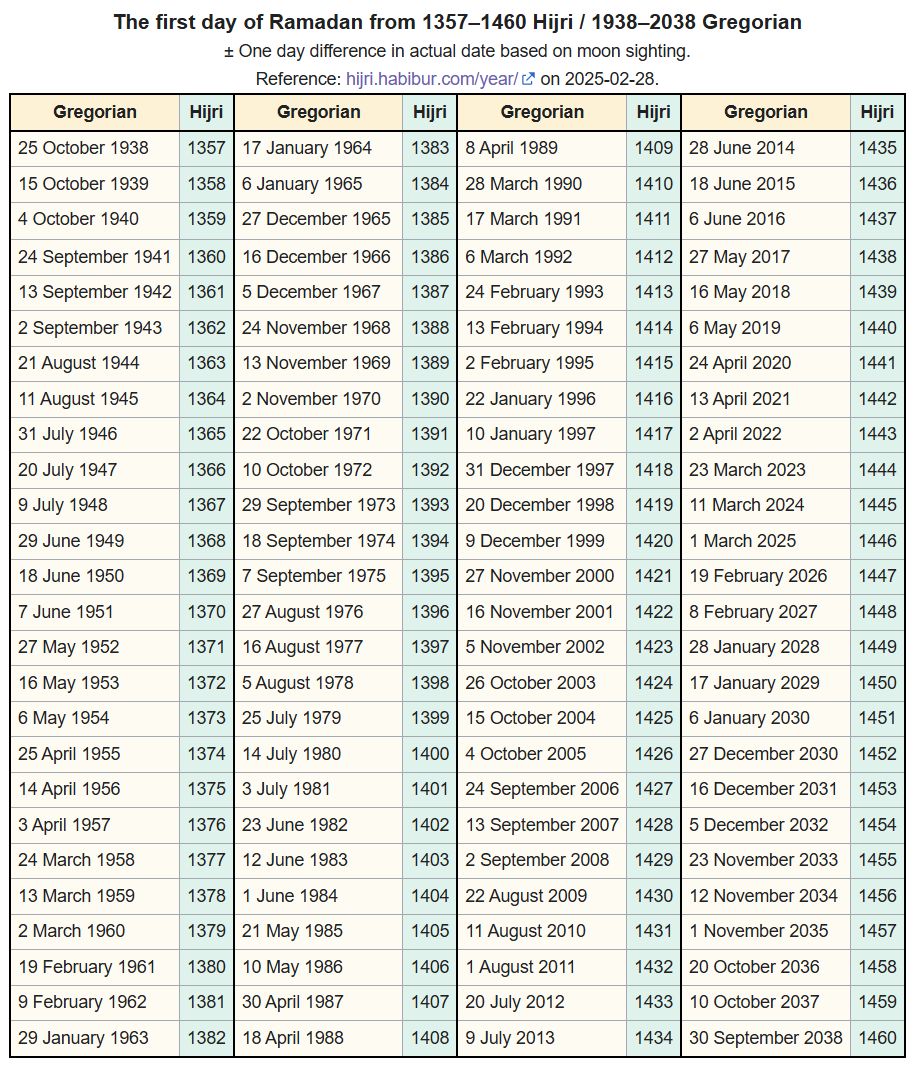
Ramadan beginning dates between Gregorian years 1938 and 2038.

Because the hilāl, or crescent moon, typically appears one day after the new moon, Muslims can usually estimate the beginning of Ramadan, but many prefer to confirm it by direct visual observation.

=== Laylat al-Qadr ===
The Laylat al-Qadr (Arabic: لیلة القدر) or "Night of Power" is the night that Muslims believe the Quran was first sent down to the world and Muhammad received his first quranic revelation. It is considered the holiest night of the year. It is generally believed to have occurred on an odd-numbered night during the last ten days of Ramadan; the Dawoodi Bohra believe that Laylat al-Qadr was the 23rd night of Ramadan.

=== Eid ===
The holiday of Eid al-Fitr (Arabic: عيد الفطر), which marks the end of Ramadan and the beginning of Shawwal, the next lunar month, is declared after a crescent new moon has been sighted or after 30 days of fasting if no sighting of the moon is possible. Eid celebrates the return to a more natural disposition (fitra) of eating, drinking, and marital intimacy.

== Religious practices ==
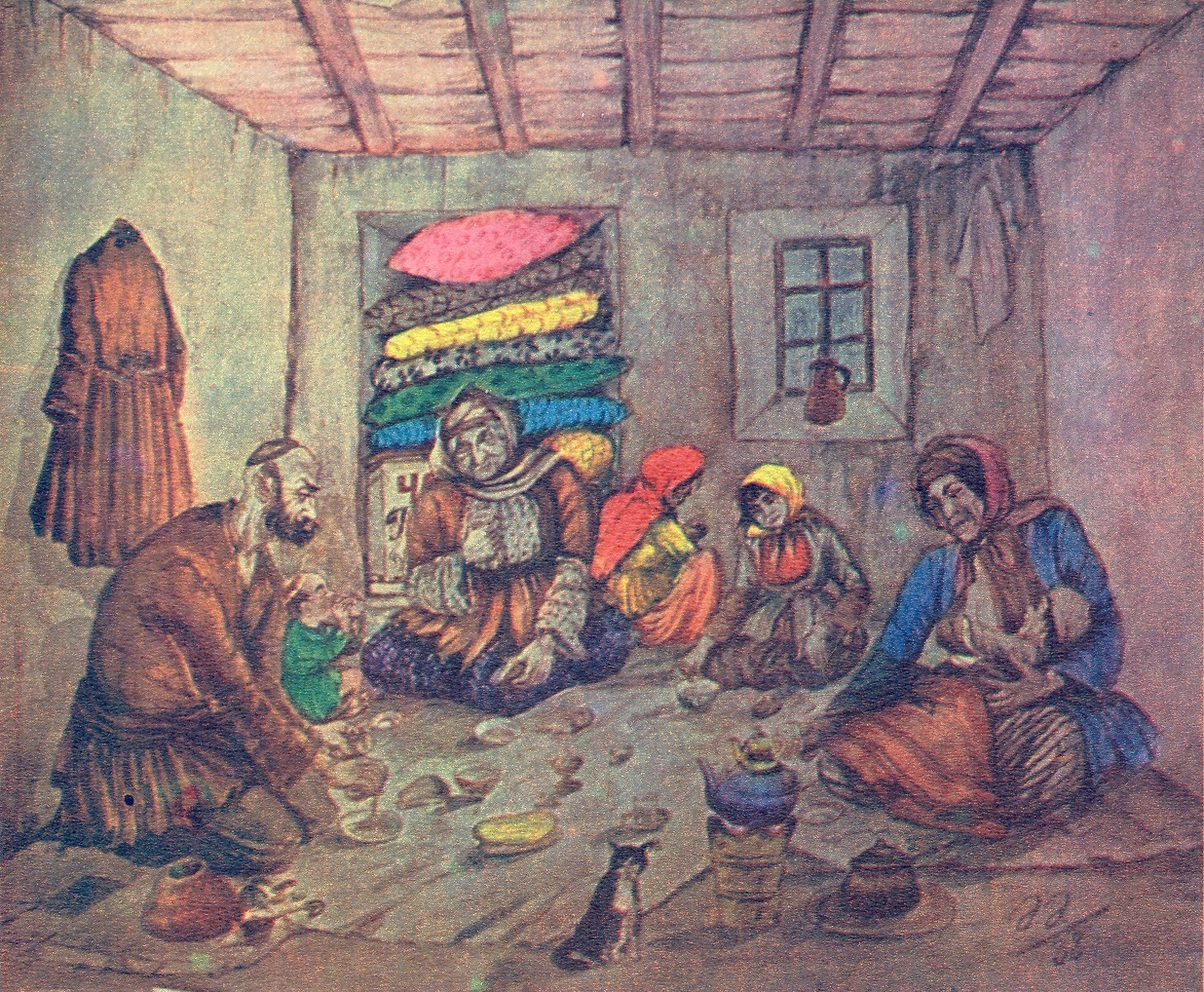
Azim Azimzade. Ramadan of the poor people. 1938

The common practice is to fast from dawn to sunset. The predawn meal before the fast is the suhur, while the meal at sunset that breaks the fast is iftar.

Muslims devote more time to prayer and acts of charity, striving to improve their self-discipline, motivated by hadith: "When Ramadan arrives, the gates of Paradise are opened and the gates of hell are locked up and devils are put in chains."

=== Fasting ===
Ramadan is a time of spiritual reflection, self-improvement, and heightened devotion and worship. Muslims are expected to put more effort into following the teachings of Islam. The fast (sawm) begins at dawn and ends at sunset. In addition to abstaining from eating and drinking, Muslims abstain from sexual relations and sinful speech and behaviour during Ramadan. Fasting is said to redirect the heart away from worldly activities and to cleanse the soul by freeing it from harmful impurities. Muslims believe that Ramadan teaches them to practice self-discipline, self-control, sacrifice, and empathy for those who are less fortunate, thus encouraging actions of generosity and compulsory charity (zakat).

Exemptions from fasting include those traveling, menstruating, severely ill, pregnant, or breastfeeding. Those unable to fast are obligated to make up the missed days later.

==== Suhur ====
Each day before dawn, Muslims eat a pre-fast meal called suhur. After finishing the meal and stopping a short time before dawn, they begin the first prayer of the day, fajr.

==== Iftar ====
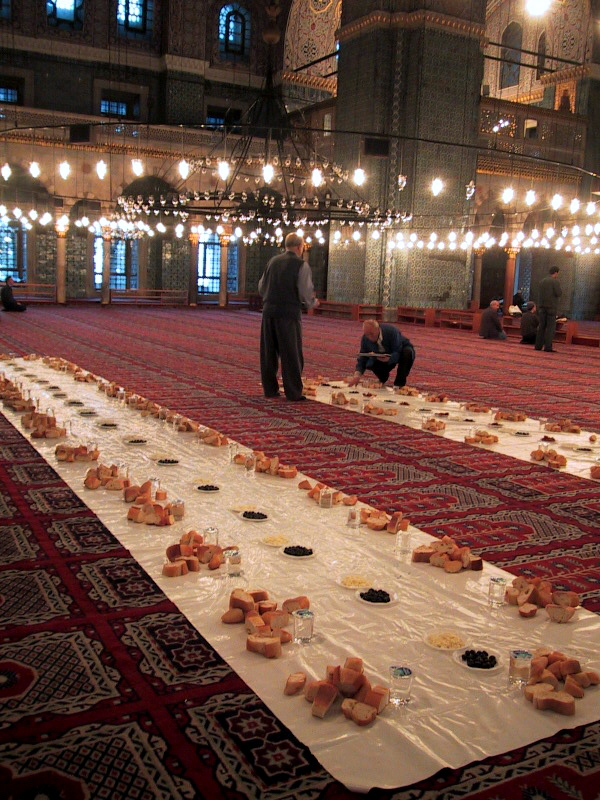
Iftar at the Sultan Ahmed Mosque in Istanbul, Turkey

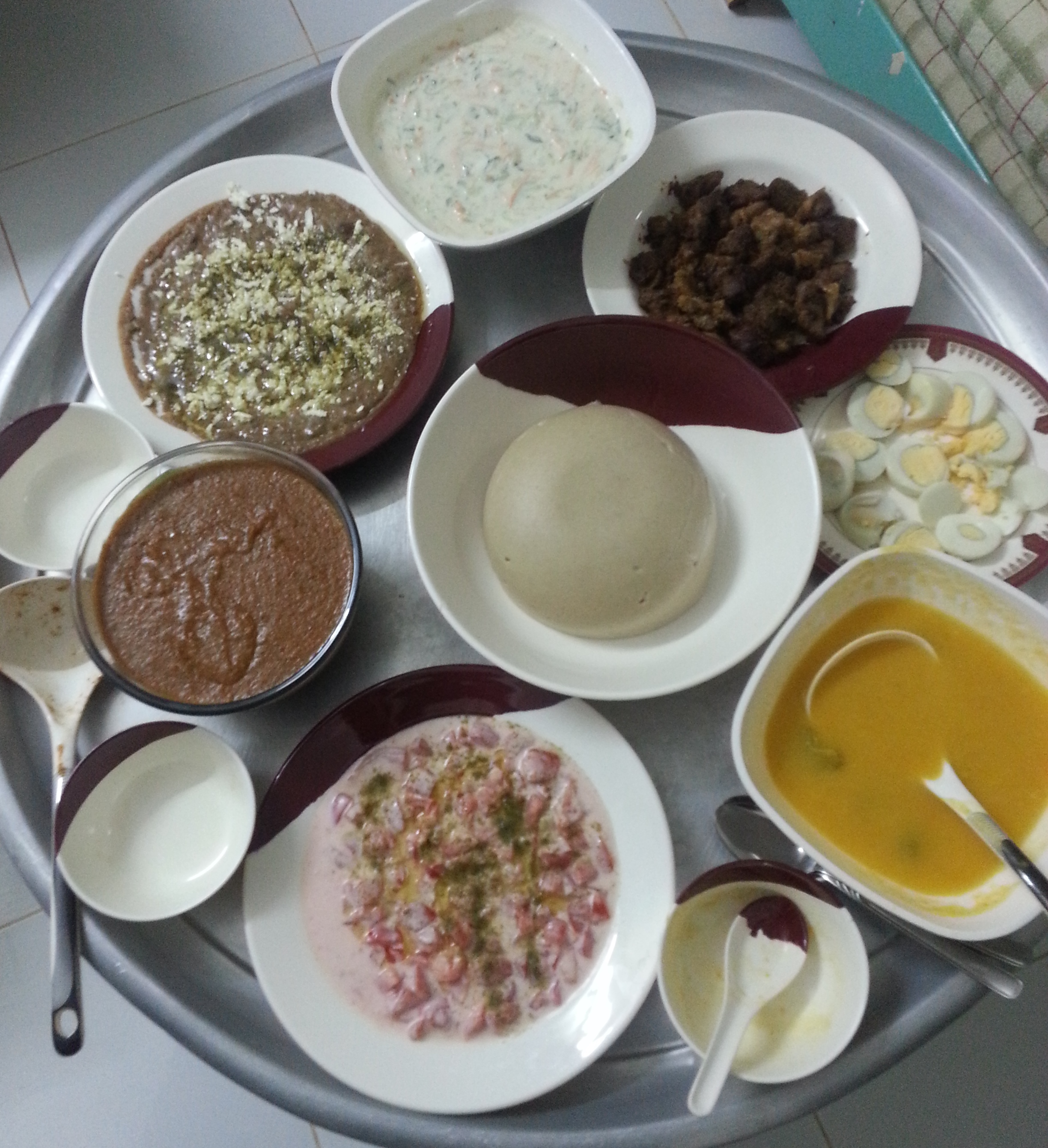
Some dishes used in breaking Ramadan fast in Nigeria

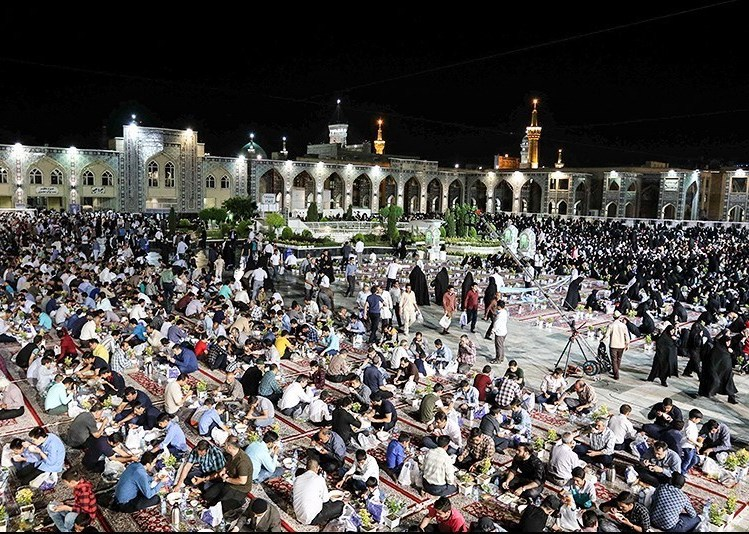
Iftar served for people fasting in the Imam Reza shrine

At sunset, families break the fast with the iftar, traditionally opening the meal by eating dates to commemorate Muhammad's practice of breaking the fast with three dates. They then adjourn for Maghrib, the fourth of the five required daily prayers, after which the main meal is served.

Social gatherings, many times in buffet style, are frequent at iftar. Traditional dishes are often highlighted, including traditional desserts, particularly those made only during Ramadan. Examples of dishes are Qatayef, Chorba frik, Knafeh, Haleem, etc. Water is usually the beverage of choice, but juice, milk, soft drinks, and caffeinated beverages are also often available.

In the Middle East, iftar consists of water, juices, dates, salads and appetizers; one or more main dishes; and rich desserts, with dessert considered the most important aspect of the meal. Typical main dishes include lamb stewed with wheat berries, lamb kebabs with grilled vegetables, and roasted chicken served with chickpea-studded rice pilaf. Desserts may include lokma, baklava, or knafeh.

Over time, the practice of iftar has evolved into banquets that may accommodate hundreds or even thousands of diners. The Sheikh Zayed Grand Mosque in Abu Dhabi, the largest mosque in the UAE, feeds up to 30,000 people every night.

=== Charity ===
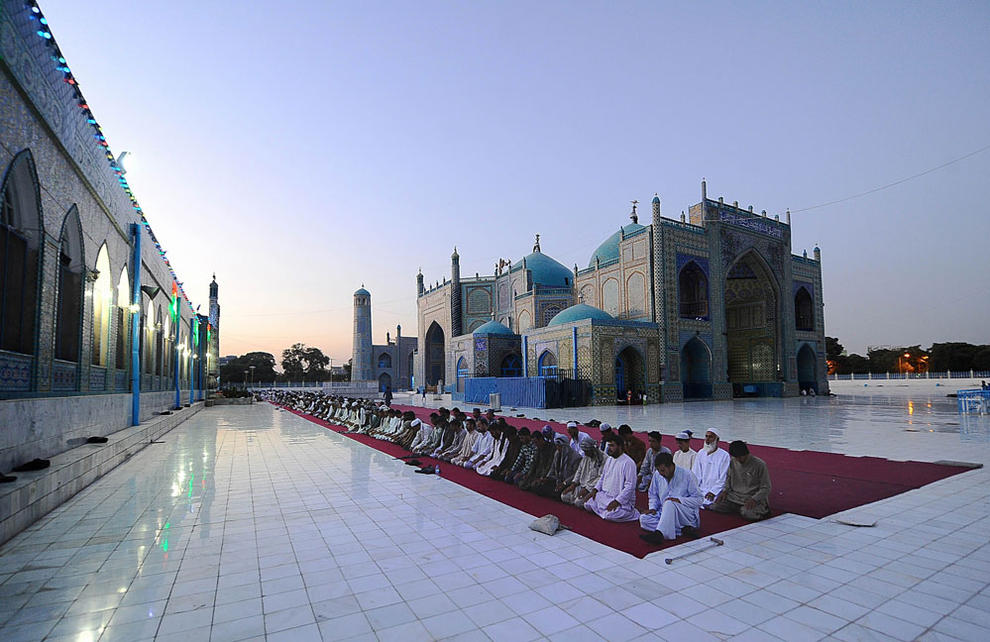
Men praying during Ramadan at the Shrine of Ali or "Blue Mosque" in Mazar-i-Sharif, Afghanistan

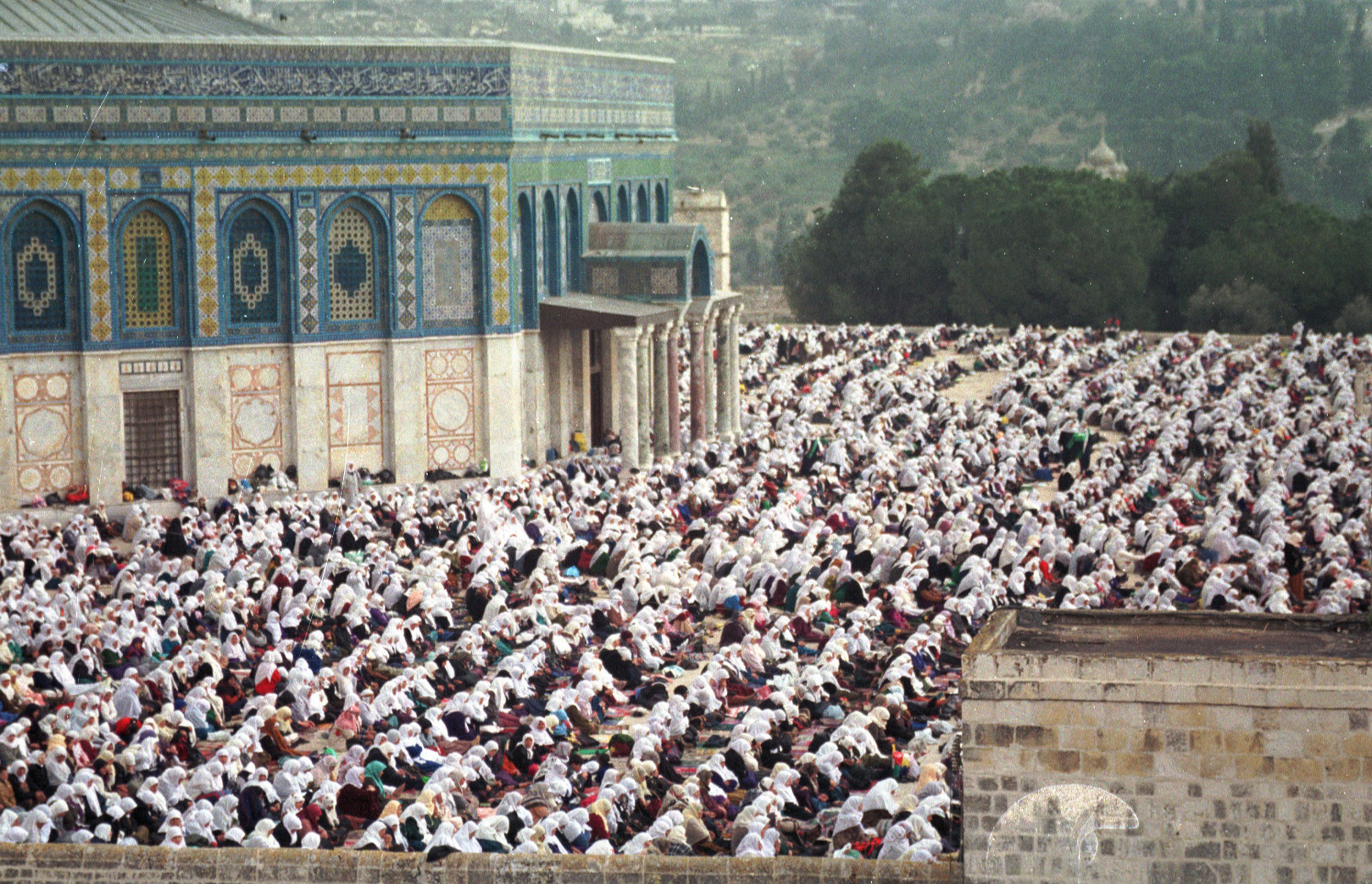
A mass prayer during the 1996 Ramadan at the Dome of the Rock in Jerusalem

Zakat, often translated as "the poor-rate", is the fixed percentage of income a believer is required to give to the poor; the practice is obligatory as one of the pillars of Islam. Muslims believe that good deeds are rewarded more handsomely during Ramadan than at any other time of the year; consequently, many Muslims donate more, or all, of their yearly zakat during this month.

=== Nightly prayers ===
Tarawih (Arabic: تراويح) are extra nightly prayers performed during the month of Ramadan. Contrary to popular belief, they are not compulsory.

=== Recitation of the Quran ===
Muslims are encouraged to read the entire Quran, which comprises thirty juz' (sections), over the thirty days of Ramadan.

== Cultural practices ==
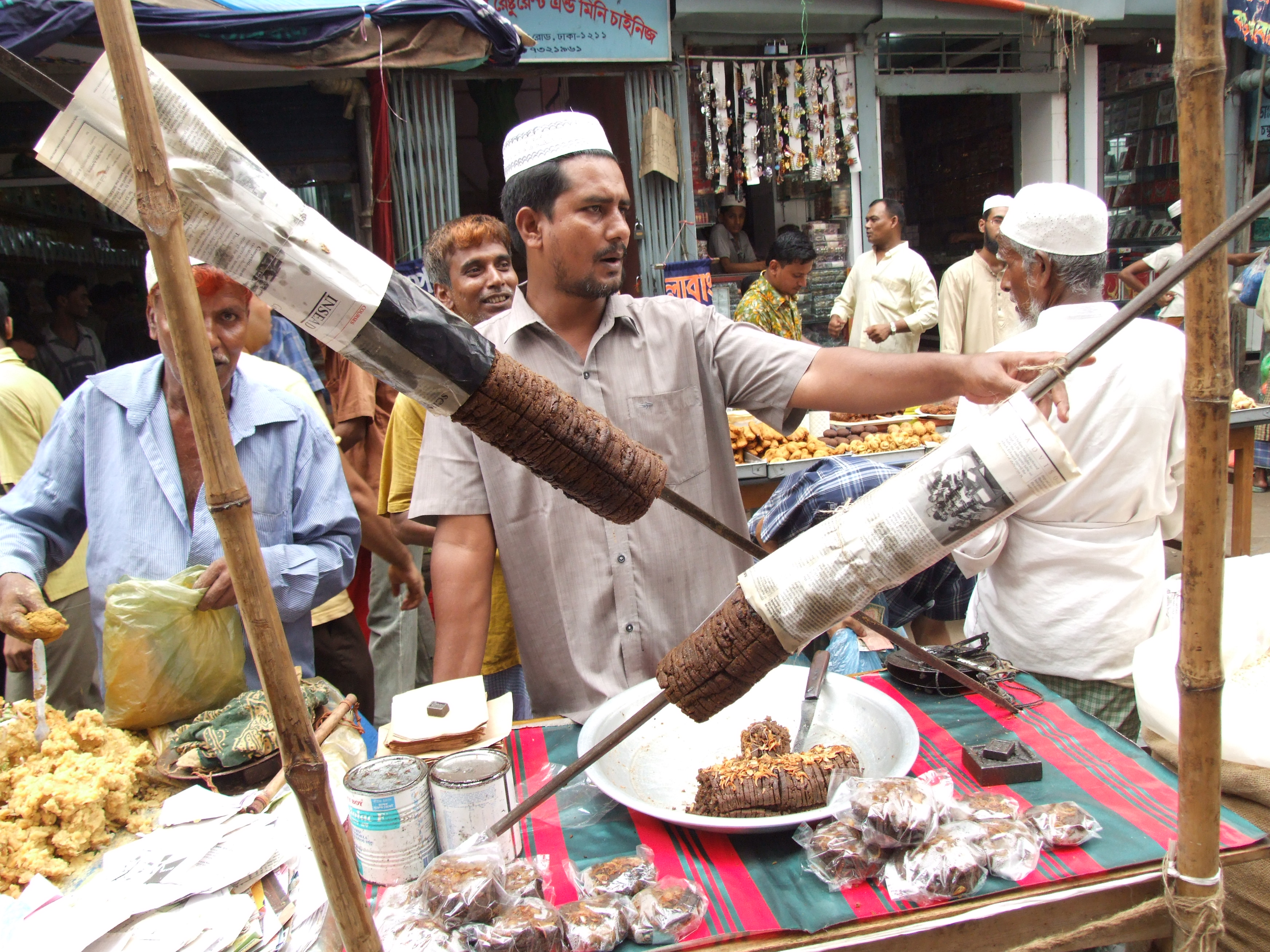
A kebab seller from Chawkbazar Iftar Market in Old Dhaka. The Chawkbazar neighborhood of Dhaka is famous for its Mughal-era Iftar market.

In some Islamic countries, lights (fanous) are strung up in public squares and across city streets, a tradition believed to have originated during the Fatimid Caliphate, where the rule of Caliph al-Mu'izz li-Din Allah was acclaimed by people holding lanterns.

An old tradition of Old Dhaka, Bangladesh is during the time of sehri, groups of people would sing qasidas to wake up the Muslims in the neighbourhood. Chowk Bazaar is a place with great significance in Bengali culture during Ramadan. Shahi jilapi is unique delicacy from the iftar market, popular for its large size.

On the island of Java, many believers bathe in holy springs to prepare for fasting, a ritual known as Padusan. The city of Semarang marks the beginning of Ramadan with the Dugderan carnival, which involves parading the warak ngendog, a horse-dragon hybrid creature allegedly inspired by the Buraq. In the Chinese-influenced capital city of Jakarta, firecrackers are widely used to celebrate Ramadan, although they are officially illegal. Towards the end of Ramadan, most employees receive a one-month bonus known as Tunjangan Hari Raya. Certain kinds of food are especially popular during Ramadan, such as large beef or buffalo in Aceh and snails in Central Java. The iftar meal is announced every evening by striking the bedug, a giant drum, in the mosque.

Common greetings during Ramadan include Ramadan mubarak and Ramadan kareem, which mean (have a) "blessed Ramadan" and "generous Ramadan" respectively.

During Ramadan in the Middle East, a mesaharati beats a drum across a neighbourhood to wake people up to eat the suhoor meal. Similarly in Southeast Asia, the kentongan slit drum is used for the same purpose.

In Nigeria, Ramadan is widely observed among Muslim communities, particularly in the northern regions. Families gather for suhur before dawn and share iftar meals at sunset, often including local foods such as rice dishes, bean cakes, and traditional drinks. Mosques host nightly prayers and charity events, while communities organize food sharing for those in need. The end of Ramadan is marked with large celebrations during Eid al-Fitr, commonly called “Small Sallah” in Nigeria.

Across West Africa, Ramadan is marked by communal prayer, evening meals shared with neighbors, and acts of charity. Mosques often organize large iftar gatherings and religious lessons during the month. Cultural expressions vary between countries but generally emphasize hospitality, generosity, and family unity.

Ramadan attracts significant increases in television viewership, as the usual prime time hours coincide with the iftar, and are commonly extended into the late-night hours to coincide with the suhur. Broadcasters in the Arab world traditionally premiere serial dramas known as musalsal during Ramadan; they are similar in style to Latin American telenovelas, and are typically around 30 episodes in length so that they run over the length of the month. Advertisers in the region have considered Ramadan to be comparable to the Super Bowl on U.S. television in terms of impact and importance; the cost of a 30-second commercial in peak time during Ramadan is usually more than double than normal.

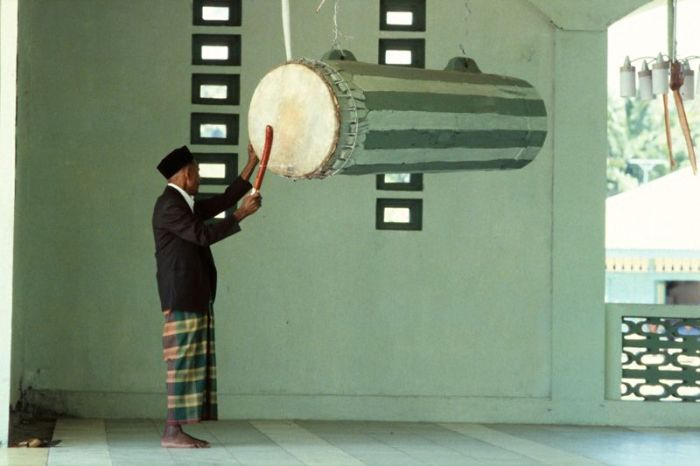
Striking the bedug in Indonesia

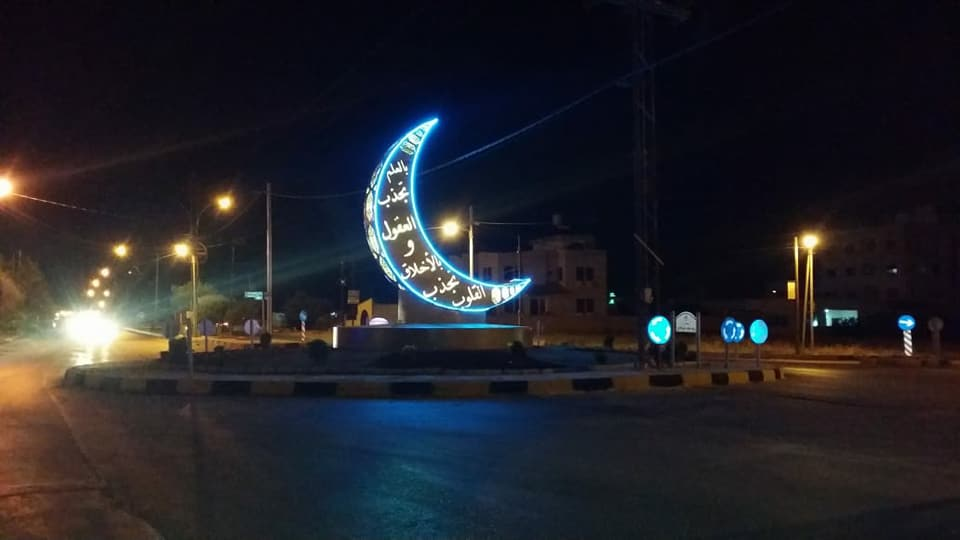
A decorated and illuminated crescent statue in Jordan

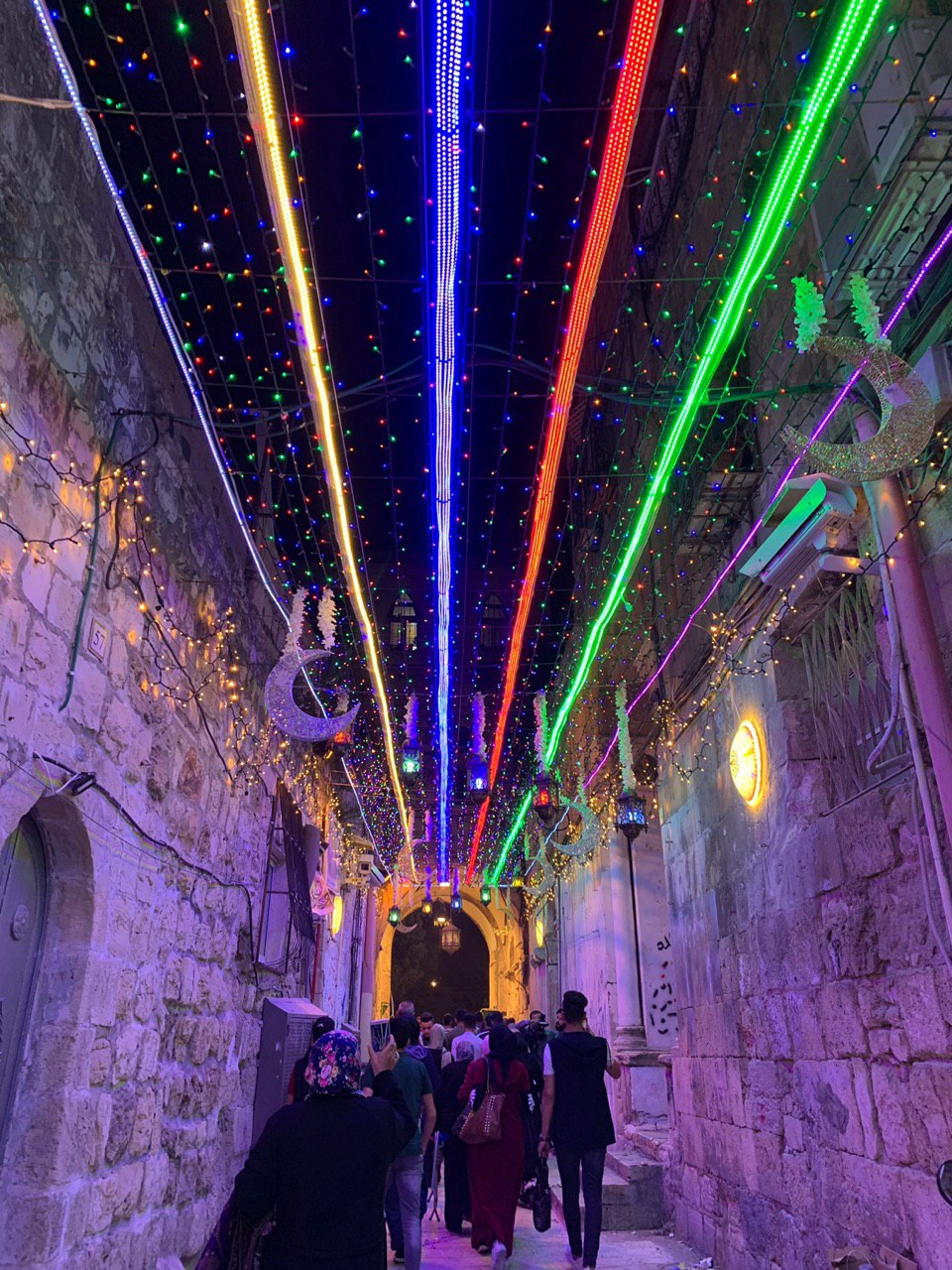
Ramadan in the Old City of Jerusalem

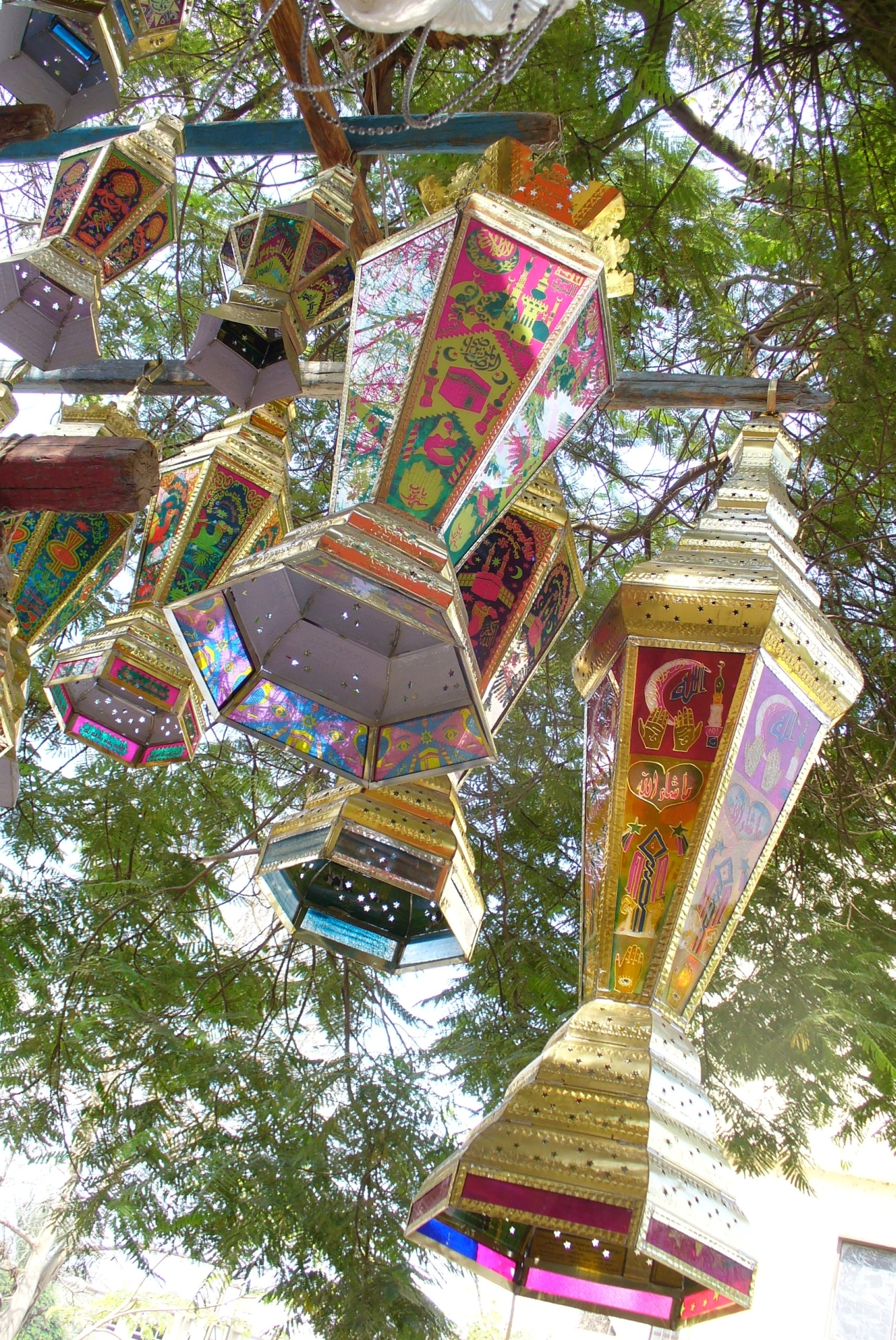
Fanous Ramadan decorations in Cairo, Egypt

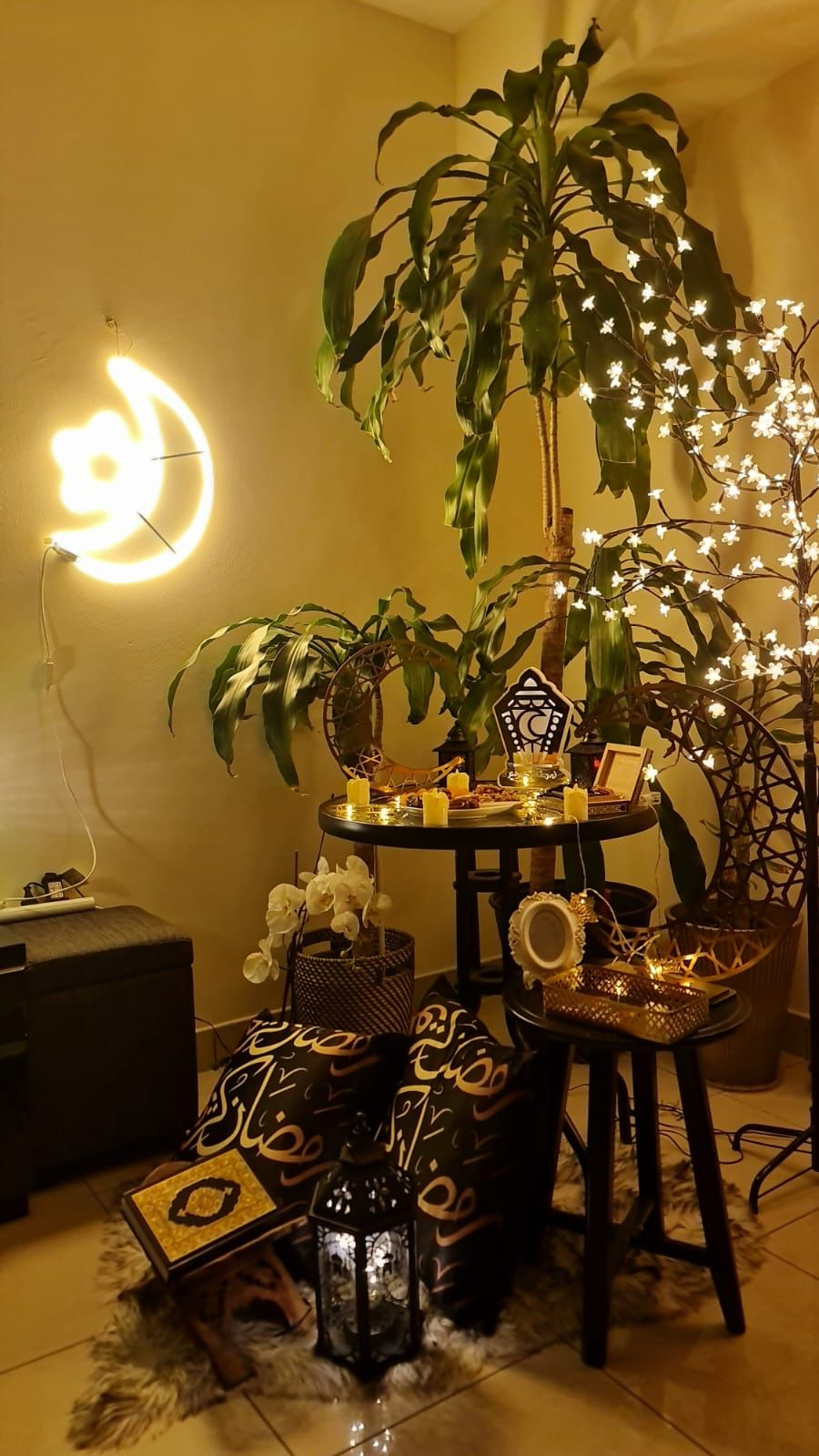
Ramadan home decorations in UAE

== Observance ==
Conversion of Hijri years 1343 to 1500 to the Gregorian calendar, with first days of al-Muharram (brown), Ramadan (grey) and Shawwal (black) bolded, and Eid al-Adha dotted – in the SVG file, hover over a spot to show its dates and a line to show the month

According to a 2012 Pew Research Center study, there was widespread Ramadan observance, with a median of 93% in the 39 countries and territories studied. Regions with high proportions of fasting among Muslims include Southeast Asia, South Asia, Middle East and North Africa, Horn of Africa and most of Sub-Saharan Africa. Proportions are lower in Central Asia and Southeast Europe, with 44% in Albania, 43% in Azerbaijan, and 30% in Kazakhstan.

According to TGM Global Ramadan Report 2023, 97% of Muslims were expected to fast during Ramadan in 2023, with regional variations showing 98.9% observance in Asia, 96.4% in the Middle East, and 95.4% in Africa. Country-specific included 99.8% in Indonesia, 99.5% in Malaysia, 99.2% in Saudi Arabia, 98.9% in Pakistan, 98.6% in Bangladesh, 97.8% in India, and 93.9% in Turkey. Muslims reported planning a range of activities for Ramadan, with 70% indicating intentions to increase worship and give to charity, rising to 74% among women. In terms of charitable behavior, 97% agreed Ramadan was a period for generosity, 60% volunteered in concrete help (with 67% in Asia), 73% had donated money to charity during Ramadan or Eid the previous year (with 84% in Asia), and 62% planned to donate more in 2023.

=== Ramadan in polar regions ===
The length of time from dawn to sunset varies by location and season. Most Muslims fast for 11 to 16 hours during Ramadan, but in polar regions, the period between dawn and sunset can exceed 22 hours. For example, in 2014, Muslims in Reykjavik, Iceland, and Trondheim, Norway, fasted almost 22 hours, while those in Sydney, Australia, fasted for about 11 hours. In areas characterized by continuous night or day, some Muslims follow the fasting schedule observed in the nearest city that experiences sunrise and sunset, while others follow Mecca time.

=== Ramadan in Earth orbit ===
Because sunrise and sunset occur 16 times each day in low-Earth orbit, Muslim astronauts in space schedule their religious practices according to the time zone of their most recent physical contact with the Earth. For example, Sheikh Muszaphar Shukor, an astronaut from Malaysia launching from the Baikonur Cosmodrome calculates their times for fasting and prayers according to the sunrise and sunset times in Cape Canaveral, which is in the Eastern Time Zone.

== Laws ==
Some Muslim countries have criminalized the consumption of food and drink in public during daylight hours in Ramadan. The sale of alcohol is prohibited during Ramadan in Egypt. The penalty for publicly eating, drinking or smoking during Ramadan can be fines or incarceration in Kuwait, Saudi Arabia, Morocco, Algeria and Malaysia. In the United Arab Emirates, the punishment is community service. In parts of northern Nigeria, the Hisbah police corps conducts raids on restaurants and shops during the month of Ramadan, arresting those found eating or drinking. Such practices have received criticism from human rights advocates.

By contrast, the observance of Ramadan is subject to government restrictions in some countries. In the USSR, the practice of Ramadan was suppressed by officials. In Albania, Ramadan festivities were banned during the communist period, but many Albanians fasted secretly.

China is reported to have banned Ramadan fasting for officials, students, and teachers in Xinjiang since 2012. Radio Free Asia alleges that residents in Kashgar Prefecture are compelled to film proof of eating for officials and are encouraged to report those who fast to the authorities. The ban has been denied by Chinese diplomats. Muslim associations in Xinjiang, Antara, Daily Times, and Pakistan Today have also brought up accounts of residents in Xinjiang fasting. According to a 2024 visit to Xinjiang by a reporter from the British magazine The Economist, many Uyghurs do not fast during Ramadan because of pressure from Chinese authorities.

== Employment during Ramadan ==
Muslims continue to work during Ramadan, but in some countries, such as Oman and Lebanon, working hours are shortened. It is often recommended that working Muslims inform their employers if they are fasting, given the potential for the observance to affect their performance. The extent to which Ramadan observers are protected by religious accommodation varies by country. Policies putting them at a disadvantage compared to other employees have been met with discrimination claims in the United Kingdom and the United States. An Arab News article reported that Saudi Arabian businesses were unhappy with shorter working hours during Ramadan, some reporting a decline in productivity of 35–50%. The Saudi businesses proposed awarding salary bonuses to incentivize longer hours. Despite the reduction in productivity, merchants can enjoy higher profit margins in Ramadan due to increase in demand.

Some countries impose modified work schedules. In Bahrain, Kuwait, Oman, Qatar, and the UAE, employees may work no more than six hours per day and 36 hours per week.

== Health effects ==
There are various health effects of fasting. Ramadan fasting is considered safe for healthy people; it may pose risks for those with certain preexisting conditions. Most Islamic scholars hold that fasting is not required for those who are ill. The elderly, pre-pubertal children, and pregnant or lactating women are exempt. Pregnant women who fast face health risks, including the potential of induced labour and gestational diabetes.

There are some health benefits of fasting in Ramadan including increasing insulin sensitivity and reducing insulin resistance. It has also been shown that there is a significant improvement in 10-year coronary heart disease risk score and other cardiovascular risk factors such as lipid profile, systolic blood pressure, weight, BMI and waist circumference in subjects with a previous history of cardiovascular disease. The fasting period is usually associated with modest weight loss, but weight can return afterwards.

In many cultures, it is associated with heavy food and water intake during Suhur and Iftar times, which may do more harm than good. Ramadan fasting is safe for healthy people provided that overall food and water intake is adequate but those with medical conditions should seek medical advice if they encounter health problems before or during fasting.

The education departments of Berlin and the United Kingdom have tried to discourage students from fasting during Ramadan, as they state that not eating or drinking can lead to concentration problems and bad grades.

A review of the literature by an Iranian group suggested fasting during Ramadan might produce renal injury in patients with moderate (GFR under 60 mL/min) or severe kidney disease but was not injurious to renal transplant patients with good function or most stone-forming patients.

A study on 55 professional Algerian soccer players showed that performance during Ramadan declined significantly for speed, agility, dribbling speed and endurance, and most stayed low two weeks after the conclusion of Ramadan.

== See also ==
- Fasting and abstinence of the Coptic Orthodox Church
- Laylatul Qadr
- Ramadan in the United Arab Emirates
- Shraavana
