= Kompang =

Indonesian traditional musical instrument

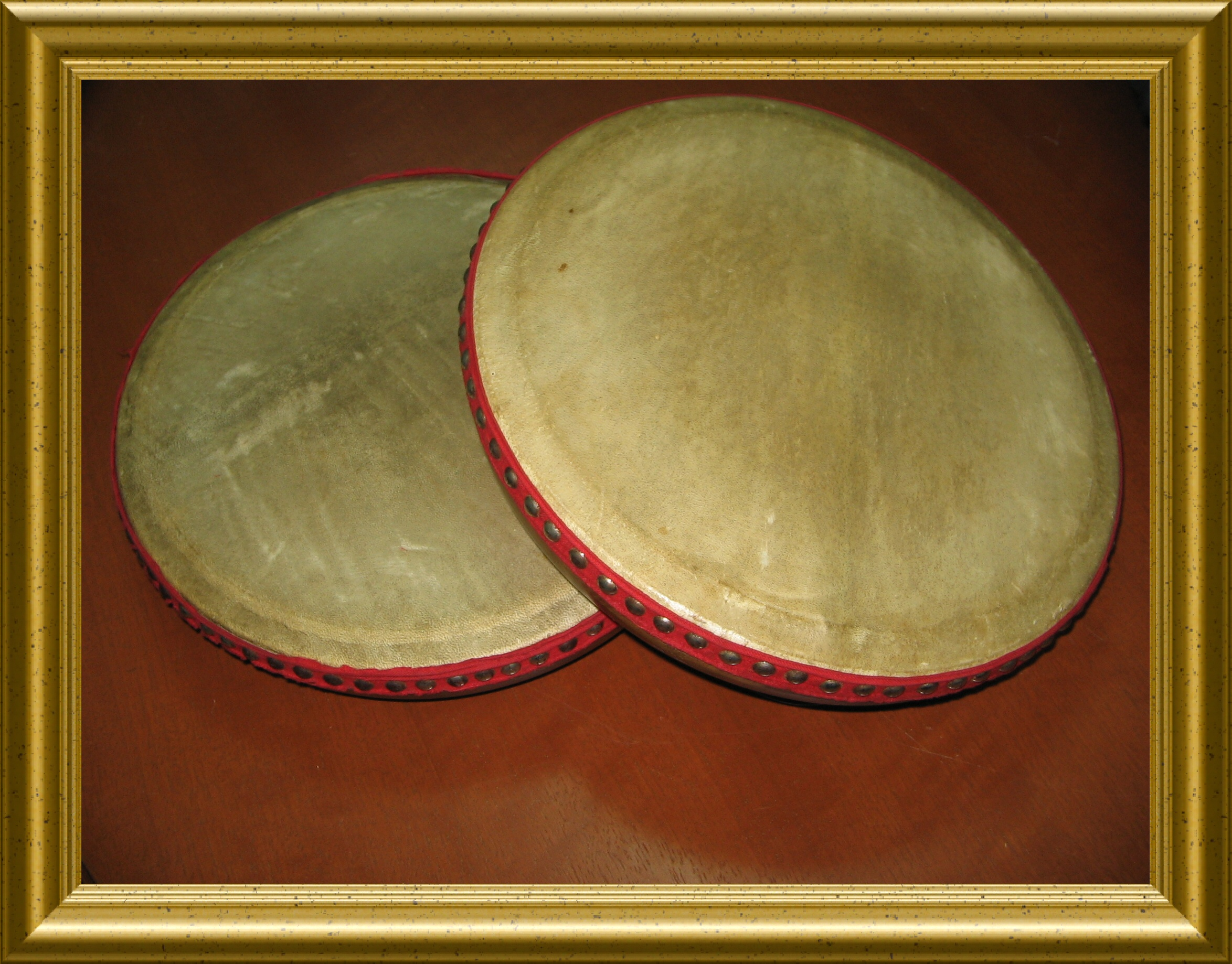

Percussion instrument
- Other names: terbangan
- Classification: Frame drum
- Hornbostel–Sachs classification: 211.311 (Directly struck membranophone)
- Inventor: Javanese
- Developed: Indonesia

Gamelan
- UNESCO Intangible Cultural Heritage
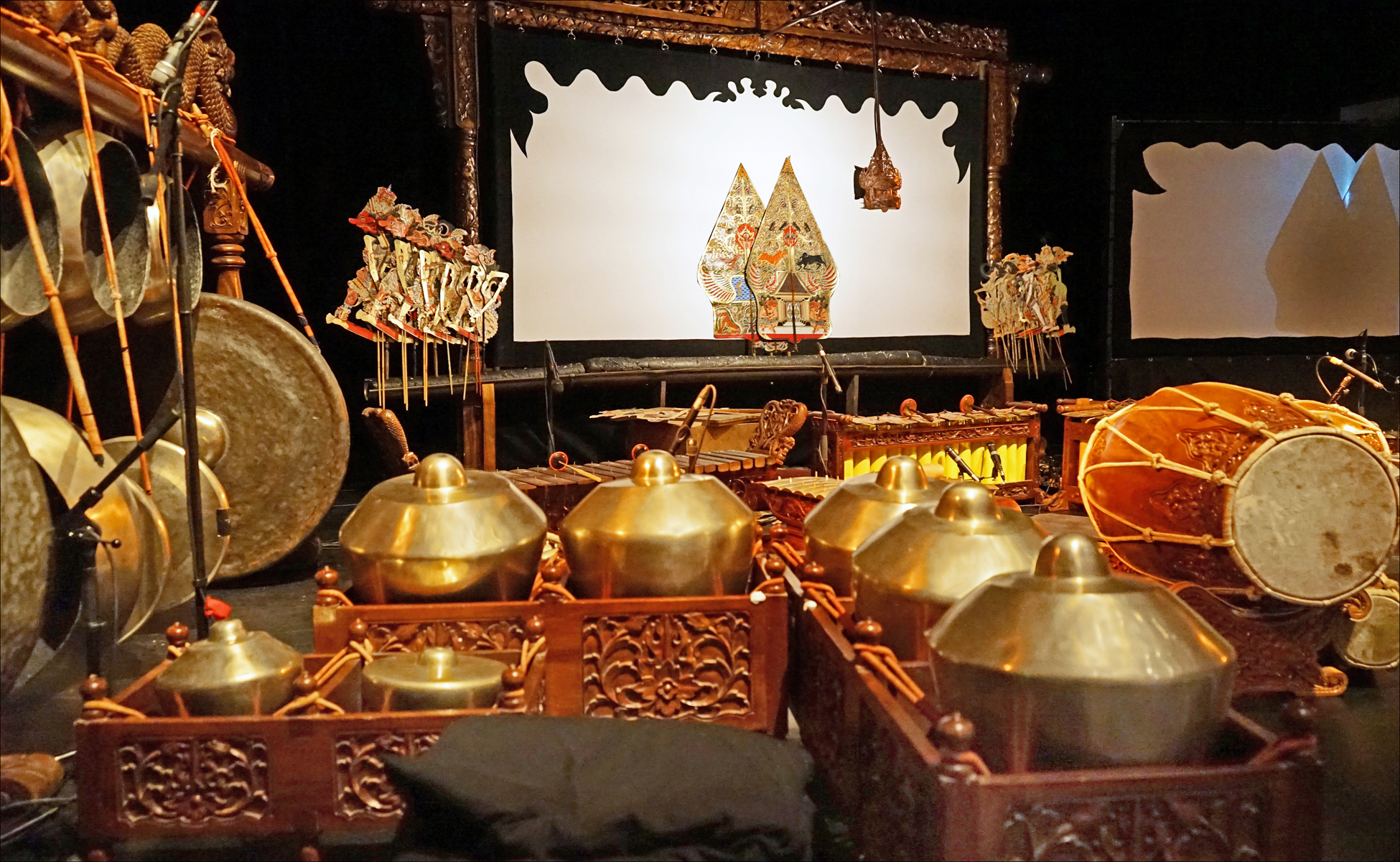
- Gamelan musical instrument
- Country: Indonesia
- Domains: Traditional craftsmanship, oral traditions and expressions, performing arts, knowledge and practices concerning nature and the universe, social practices, rituals and festive events
- Reference: 01607
- Region: Asia and the Pacific

Inscription history
- Inscription: 2021 (16th session)
- List: Representative List
- Gamelan variations consist of: Javanese gamelan (gamelan jawa) of Central Java and Special Region of Yogyakarta, Balinese gamelan (gamelan bali) of Bali, Sundanese gamelan (gamelan sunda) of West Java, Madurese gamelan (gamelan madura) and Banyuwangian Gamelan (gamelan banyuwangi) of East Java, Gendang beleq of West Nusa Tenggara, Banjarese gamelan (gamelan banjar) of South Kalimantan, Gamelan peking of Lampung, and Talempong of West Sumatra. Gamelan instruments: slab-type (wilahan) instruments (saron/sarun/pemade, demung/sarun ganal, Gendèr/kiliningan, slenthem/selentem/jegogan, peking/sarun paking/kantilan, kecrek/keprak), gong-type (pencon) instruments (gong, kempul, kenong, bonang, trompong, kethuk, talempong, kempyang), String instruments (siter, celempung, kecapi, rebab), Bamboo instrument (suling), Drums instruments (kendhang, Bedug, ketipung, gendang beleq), Wooden instrument (gambang) Idiophone instrument (kemanak)

Kompang (Balinese: ᬓᭀᬫ᭄ᬧᬂ; Javanese: ꦏꦺꦴꦩ꧀ꦥꦁ, Javanese pronunciation: [ˈkɔmˈpaːŋ]) is a traditional Balinese and Javanese musical instrument part of gamelan in the percussion family originated from Ponorogo in East Java. Kompang has existed in Java since at least the 8th century and has spread to various regions of Indonesia as well as the Southeast Asia in general, such as Singapore, Malaysia, Brunei and Thailand, which later became known as Kompang Jawa.

Since 2011, several types of Kompang have been recorded and recognized by the Ministry of Education, Culture, Research, and Technology as National Intangible Cultural Heritage of Indonesia. And in 2021, the United Nations Educational, Scientific and Cultural Organization or what is often known as UNESCO has designated Gamelan (a set of musical instruments that includes Kompang) as an Intangible Cultural Heritage from Indonesia.

== Etymology ==
Etymologically, the word 'kompang' is absorbed from the Javanese: ꦏꦺꦴꦩ꧀ꦥ꧀ꦭꦁ, romanized: komplang which means "empty" or "hollow", this refers to the shape of the kompang musical instrument itself which has a hollow part (on the back that is not covered with skin) so that it can produce loud sounds when hit.

== History ==
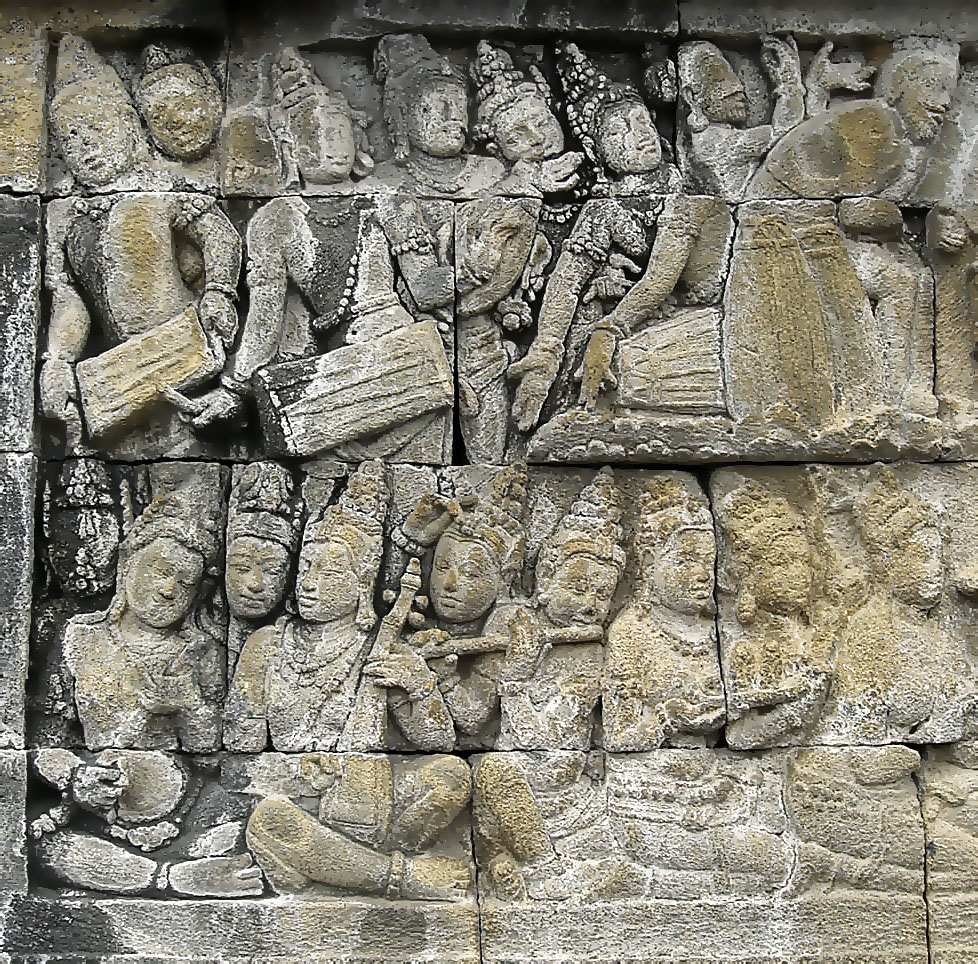
The reliefs on the walls of Borobudur temple depict Kompang players

The history of Kompang cannot be separated from the history of the gamelan, which is a unified musical instrument created on the island of Java for centuries.

Kompang was originally created by the people of Ponorogo, who at that time still adhered to the beliefs of Animism and Kejawen, until finally the teachings of Hinduism and Buddhism entered. Gamelan (which includes kompang as a part of it) is still sustainable until the era of Islamic teachings entering Ponorogo, the people of Ponorogo who like the art of gamelan assimilate gamelan as a means of celebrating Muslim religious activities which are known by the Javanese people as sholawatan.

In the past, the shape of the Kompang was very large. Over time, now kompang has a variety of varied forms; from small to large. Although currently the kompang form is dominated by medium sizes, in Ponorogo very large sizes are still available and are still being played.

Gamelan instruments were introduced to form a set of musical instruments and developed during the Majapahit empire, and spread to various regions such as Balinese, Sundanese, and Lombok. According to inscriptions and manuscripts that date from the Majapahit period, the Majapahit empire had an art hall that supervised performances, including gamelan (which includes kompang). The art hall oversees the construction of musical instruments, and schedules performances.

== Deployment ==
The number of traditional Islamic boarding schools in Ponorogo are famous, making the alumni of the Pesantren in Ponorogo bring Kompang musical instruments to various regions on the island of Java which are then developed in each area for the alumni of the students.

Kompang Ponorogo also spread to the Malay area because of the marriage of the son of the kiayi of the Tegalsari Pesantren married to the Princess of the Sultan of Selangor. The delegation from the Tegalsari Islamic boarding school presented Kompang's offerings during the wedding, to Kompang Ponorogo, which is also loved by the Malay community in Selaongor. From Selangor, Kompang spread to neighboring sultanates such as Johor, Riau, Pattani to Brunei and Sabah, in the Malay area Kompang Ponorogo is called Kompang Jawa.

== See also ==
- Rebana
- Music of Brunei
- Music of Malaysia
- Music of Singapore
- Music of Indonesia
