= Ramadan in the United States =

Religious observance in USA

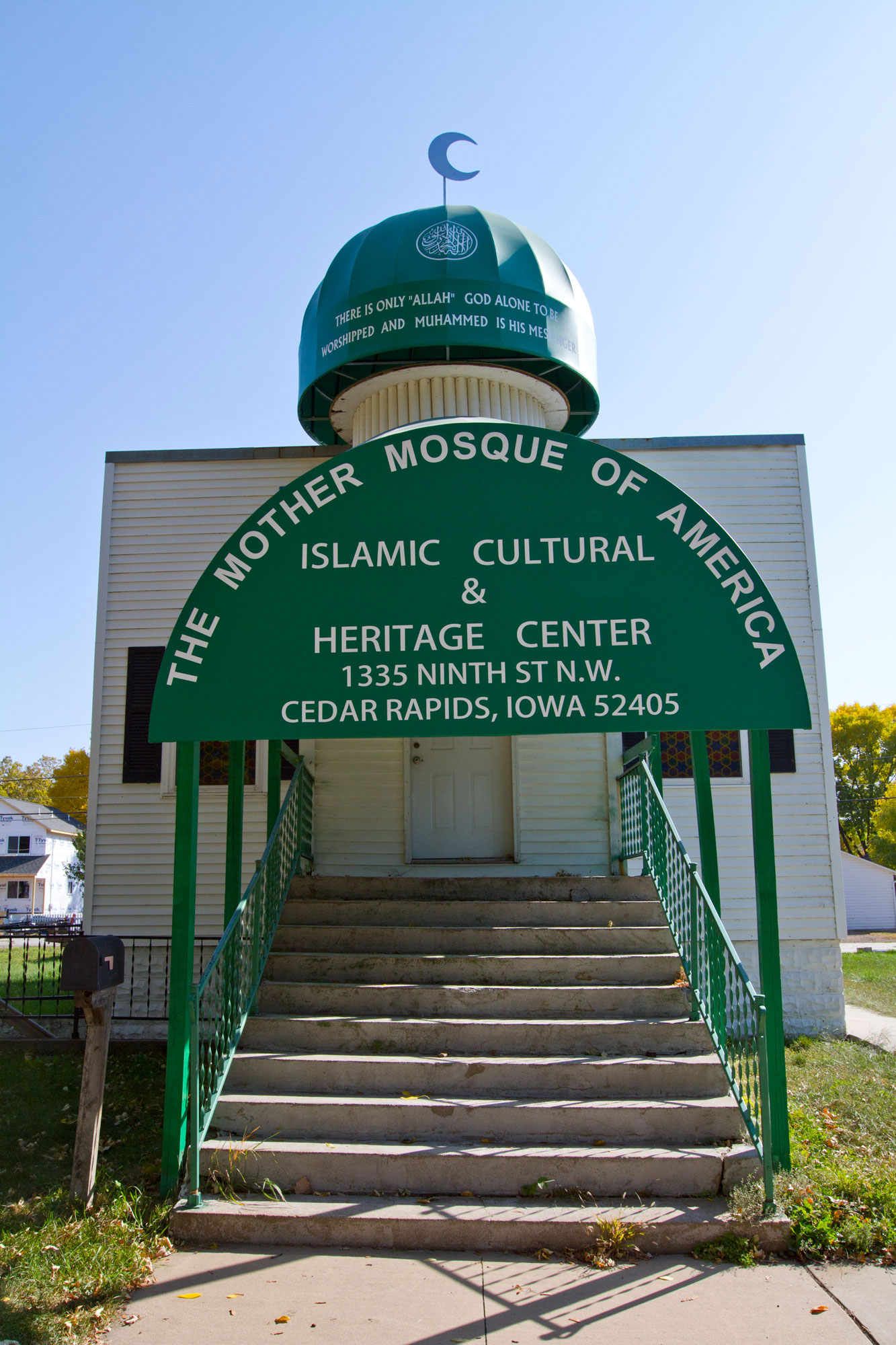
A mosque in Cedar Rapids, Iowa, where prayers and Tarawih prayers are held during Ramadan.

Muslims in the United States observe the holy month of Ramadan. As Muslims make up just over 1% of the country's population, celebrations tend to center on mosques and Islamic centers.

Islam, and by extension Ramadan, were largely introduced to the U.S. and initially practiced by enslaved African Americans. Thus, from the late 19th through much of the 20th century, Ramadan celebrations in the United States were intertwined with African-American culture and traditions.

Although Ramadan and Eid al-Fitr, the end of the month, are not federal holidays, national and state institutions may offer accommodations to those observing the holiday. Increasingly, some school districts in the United States have recognized Eid al-Fitr as a holiday and given students the day off.

== Fasting ==
According to a 2017 Pew Research Center survey, 80% of American Muslims observe the Ramadan fast, with little difference based on gender or whether they are immigrants or American-born.

== Tarawih prayers ==
Tarawih prayers are held in mosques and Islamic centers during the month of Ramadan. Muslims come to perform communal prayers and recite the Quran. Religious and educational lectures and programmes related to Ramadan are also organised in these places.

== Communication and social coexistence ==
Some Ramadan events in the United States aim to foster communication and social coexistence between Muslims and non-Muslims. Joint Iftar banquets are organized where non-Muslims are invited to experience iftar and exchange cultures and knowledge.

== Challenges ==
Muslims in the United States face some challenges while fasting and observing Ramadan in a non-Islamic environment. Common challenges include:

- Dietary challenges: It may be difficult to find halal food or meals that meet the needs of fasting people in some areas. Muslims may need to look for special Grocery stores or [restaurants that offer halal meals.
- Tools and facilities: Muslims may struggle to find a suitable place to pray or enough time to rest and relax during the day.
- Communication and understanding: Muslims may need to cotell non-Muslim colleagues and friends about their religious needs and requirements during Ramadan. It can be challenging to explain Islamic customs, traditions, and expectations of those fasting.

== See also ==
- Ramadan in Pakistan
- Ramadan in Russia
- Ramadan in Turkey
- Ramadan in the United Arab Emirates
- Ramadan in the United Kingdom
