= Ramadan in Russia =

Religious observance in Russia

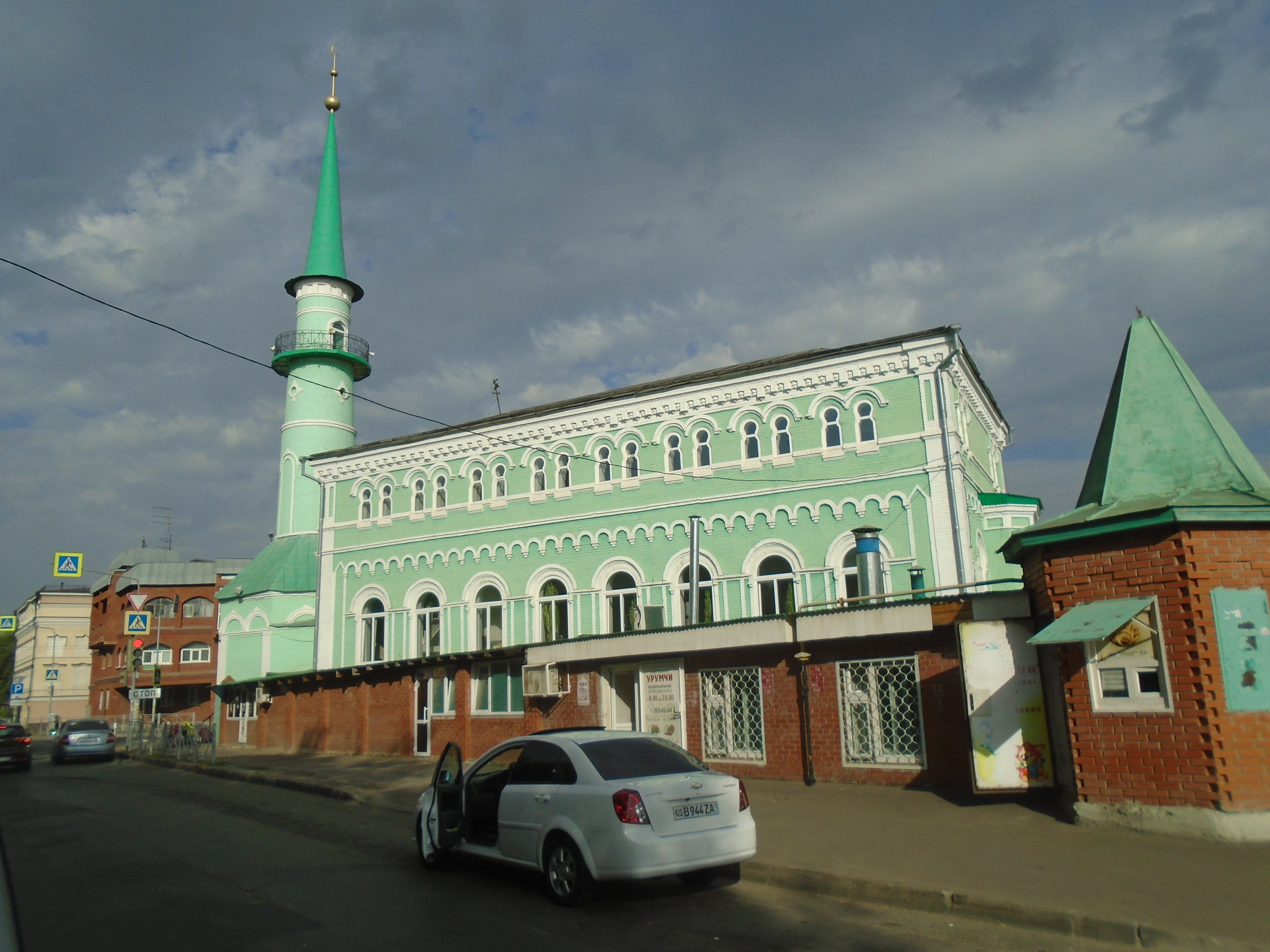
Sultan Mosque in Russia, where Islamic rituals are performed, including Tarawih prayers during Ramadan

Ramadan is an important month in the Islamic world, and Muslims around the world celebrate it in a variety of ways. In Russia, Muslims experience this holy month amidst unique challenges and opportunities. Ramadan in Russia is characterized by a rich history and continuous evolution of the Russian-Islamic experience.

== Customs and traditions ==
Muslims in Russia observe Ramadan in accordance with their own culture and traditions. In Russian cities such as Moscow, Kazan, and Grozny, groups put up Ramadan decorations and host special events.

One unique challenge for some Russian Muslims is that when the month falls between May and July, extended daylight hours - in St Petersburg, sometimes up to 22 hours of sunlight - extend the Ramadan fast dramatically.

In Tatarstan, pancakes are eaten to celebrate Eid al-Fitr.

== Religious and cultural coexistence ==
Russia witnesses religious and cultural coexistence between Muslims and non-Muslims during Ramadan. The Russian government has provided designated places for breaking the fast in public places. Interfaith events are organized to promote mutual understanding and peaceful coexistence.

Eid al-Fitr, the end of Ramadan, is a public holiday in Russia's Muslim-majority republics, such as Tatarstan.

== Mosques and religious practices ==
A variety of religious and social events are organized in mosques during Ramadan, including group iftars and donations to the poor and needy.

In 2024, 180,000 attendees celebrated Eid al-Fitr at Cathedral Mosque in Moscow.

== See also ==
- Ramadan in the United States
- Ramadan in India
- Ramadan in Pakistan
- Ramadan in the United Kingdom
- Ramadan in Turkey
- Ramadan in the United Arab Emirates
