= Ramadan in the United Kingdom =

Religious observance in UK

Ramadan in the United Kingdom is observed by the country’s Muslim community, which constitutes approximately 6.0% of the population (nearly 3.9 million people), making Islam the second-largest religion in the UK after Christianity.

== Moon sighting ==
Ramadan’s dates in the UK follow the Islamic lunar calendar. In modern times, the start is confirmed moon sightings within the United Kingdom via the New Crescent Society often in collaboration with the Royal Observatory Greenwich, though some minority communities rely on announcements from Saudi Arabia's astronomical calculations though the validity of this is within Sunni Islam is disputed.

== Predicted Ramadan dates in the United Kingdom (1447–1457 AH) ==
The table below shows predicted start dates for Ramadan and Eid al-Fitr in the United Kingdom according to crescent visibility data published by the HM Nautical Almanac Office, as applied by the New Crescent Society (NCS), the leading UK moonsighting organisation. All dates are provisional and subject to local moonsighting.

Predicted Ramadan and Eid al-Fitr dates (UK, 1447–1457 AH)
| Hijri Year | Ramadan start date (UK) | Eid al-Fitr start date (UK) | Status |
|---|---|---|---|
| 1447 AH | 19 February 2026 | 21 March 2026 | Confirmed |
| 1448 AH | 8 February 2027 | 10 March 2027 | Predicted |
| 1449 AH | 29 January 2028 | 28 February 2028 | Predicted |
| 1450 AH | 17 January 2029 | 15 February 2029 | Predicted |
| 1451 AH | 6 January 2030 | 4 February 2030 | Predicted |
| 1452 AH | 26 December 2030 | 25 January 2031 | Predicted |
| 1453 AH | 16 December 2031 | 14 January 2032 | Predicted |
| 1454 AH | 5 December 2032 | 3 January 2033 | Predicted |
| 1455 AH | 24 November 2033 | 23 December 2033 | Predicted |
| 1456 AH | 13 November 2034 | 13 December 2034 | Predicted |
| 1457 AH | 2 November 2035 | 2 December 2035 | Predicted |

== Religious practices ==
Muslims abstain from food, drink, and sinful behavior from dawn (Suhoor) to sunset (Iftar). Due to the UK’s longer daylight hours fasting reaches up to 16–17 hours in summer. Just like other mosques the London Central Mosque host nightly Taraweeh prayers, with Quran recitation competitions and translations in sign language for inclusivity. The "Night of Power" (27th Ramadan) is commemorated with extended prayers and Quranic readings.

== Culinary traditions and Iftar meals ==
Breaking the fast with Iftar is a cherished tradition. In the UK, Iftar meals often feature a blend of traditional dishes from various cultures. Common items include dates, lentil soups, samosas, and kebabs. Resources like BBC Good Food offer a collection of recipes tailored for Ramadan, ranging from energizing Suhoor options to hearty Iftar dishes.

Restaurants and supermarkets in the UK often cater to the increased demand for halal food and special Ramadan delicacies.

== Charitable activities and community engagement ==
Charity is a cornerstone of Ramadan. In the UK, initiatives like the Ramadan Tent Project exemplify this spirit by hosting free Open Iftar events in iconic locations such as Trafalgar Square and the Victoria and Albert Museum. These events aim to foster cross-cultural understanding and community cohesion by inviting people of all backgrounds to share in the Iftar experience.

Organizations like the Muslim World League in London host interfaith meals with Christian, Jewish, and Bahá’í leaders, fostering social cohesion.

"Iftar With Your Neighbour" a Projects that invite asylum seekers and non-Muslims to share meals, emphasizing solidarity.

Political leaders, including the Prime Minister, issue Ramadan greetings, raising awareness and hosting Iftar Party.

== Economic impact ==
The term "Ramadan Rush" emerged in 2011 to describe the surge in retail activity during Ramadan, attributed to an influx of wealthy Middle Eastern visitors to the UK.

Ramadan significantly contributes to the UK economy, with estimates suggesting its total economic impact ranges between £800 million and £1.3 billion annually. This includes retail spending on food, clothing, and gifts, as well as charitable contributions. The travel and tourism sector also experiences a boost, as many Muslims travel to visit family and friends or embark on holidays during this period. Recent reports indicate that the UK's Ramadan economy has grown rapidly over the past decade, reflecting the increasing purchasing power and influence of British Muslims.

== Media coverage and public perception ==
Media representation of Ramadan has seen notable developments. In 2025, the BBC broadcast Eid prayers live from Bradford Central Mosque for the first time. However, media portrayals can also spark controversy; for instance, London Mayor Sadiq Khan faced criticism over his Eid message referencing international conflicts, leading to debates about the politicization of religious observances.

== See also ==
- Ramadan in Pakistan
- Ramadan in the United States
- Ramadan in Turkey
