= 2015–16 National One Day Cup =

- Dates: 10 January 2016 – 29 January 2016
- Administrator: Pakistan Cricket Board
- Cricket format: List A cricket
- Tournament format(s): Round-robin and knockout
- Host: Pakistan
- Champions: National Bank of Pakistan and Islamabad (shared)
- Participants: 16

The 2015–16 National One Day Cup was the thirty-first edition of the National One Day Championship, the premier List A cricket domestic competition in Pakistan. It was held from 10 to 29 January 2016.

The trophy was shared by National Bank of Pakistan and Islamabad after the final was abandoned without a ball being bowled due to rain.

== Group stage ==
The top two teams in each group after the round-robin stage (highlighted) qualified for the knockout stage.

Group A
Team	Pld	W	L	NR	NRR	Pts
United Bank Ltd.	7	5	1	1	+1.529	11
Islamabad	7	4	2	1	+0.330	9
Sui Southern Gas Company	7	4	2	1	+0.195	9
Port Qasim Authority	7	3	3	1	+0.449	7
Peshawar	7	2	3	2	–0.439	6
Sui Northern Gas Pipelines Ltd.	7	2	4	1	–0.415	5
Lahore Blues	7	2	4	1	–0.774	5
Hyderabad	7	1	4	2	–0.923	4

Group B
Team	Pld	W	L	NR	NRR	Pts
Khan Research Labs.	7	7	0	0	+1.660	14
National Bank of Pakistan	7	5	2	0	+0.787	10
Habib Bank Limited	7	5	2	0	+0.323	10
Water and Power Dev. Auth.	7	4	3	0	+0.841	8
Karachi Whites	7	2	5	0	–0.206	4
Lahore Whites	7	2	5	0	–0.657	4
Fed. Admin. Tribal Areas	7	2	5	0	–1.824	4
Rawalpindi	7	1	6	0	–0.888	2

Source:Cricinfo

== Knockout stage ==
Semi-final 1
26 January 2016

United Bank Limited; 185 (48.5 overs)	v	National Bank of Pakistan; 189/4 (41.4 overs)
Hammad Azam 59 (83); Zia-ul-Haq 5/33 (7.5 overs)		Akbar-ur-Rehman 70* (84); Hammad Azam 2/38 (10 overs)

National Bank of Pakistan won by 6 wickets
Gaddafi Stadium, Lahore
Umpires: Asif Yaqoob and Qaiser Waheed
Player of the match: Zia-ul-Haq (NBP)

- National Bank of Pakistan won the toss and elected to field.

Semi-final 2
27 January 2016

Khan Research Laboratories; 231/9 (50 overs)	v	Islamabad; 232/3 (46 overs)
Shoaib Ahmed 74 (85); Hasan Ali 4/28 (10 overs)		Shahid Yousuf 100* (89); Sadaf Hussain 1/39 (9 overs)

Islamabad won by 7 wickets
Gaddafi Stadium, Lahore
Umpires: Khalid Mahmood and Riazuddin
Player of the match: Shahid Yousuf

- Islamabad won the toss and elected to field.

Final
29 January 2016

Islamabad	v	National Bank of Pakistan

Match abandoned; trophy shared
Gaddafi Stadium, Lahore
Umpires: Khalid Mahmood and Qaiser Waheed

- No play was possible due to rain.
