= Ramadan in Iran =

Religious observance in Iran

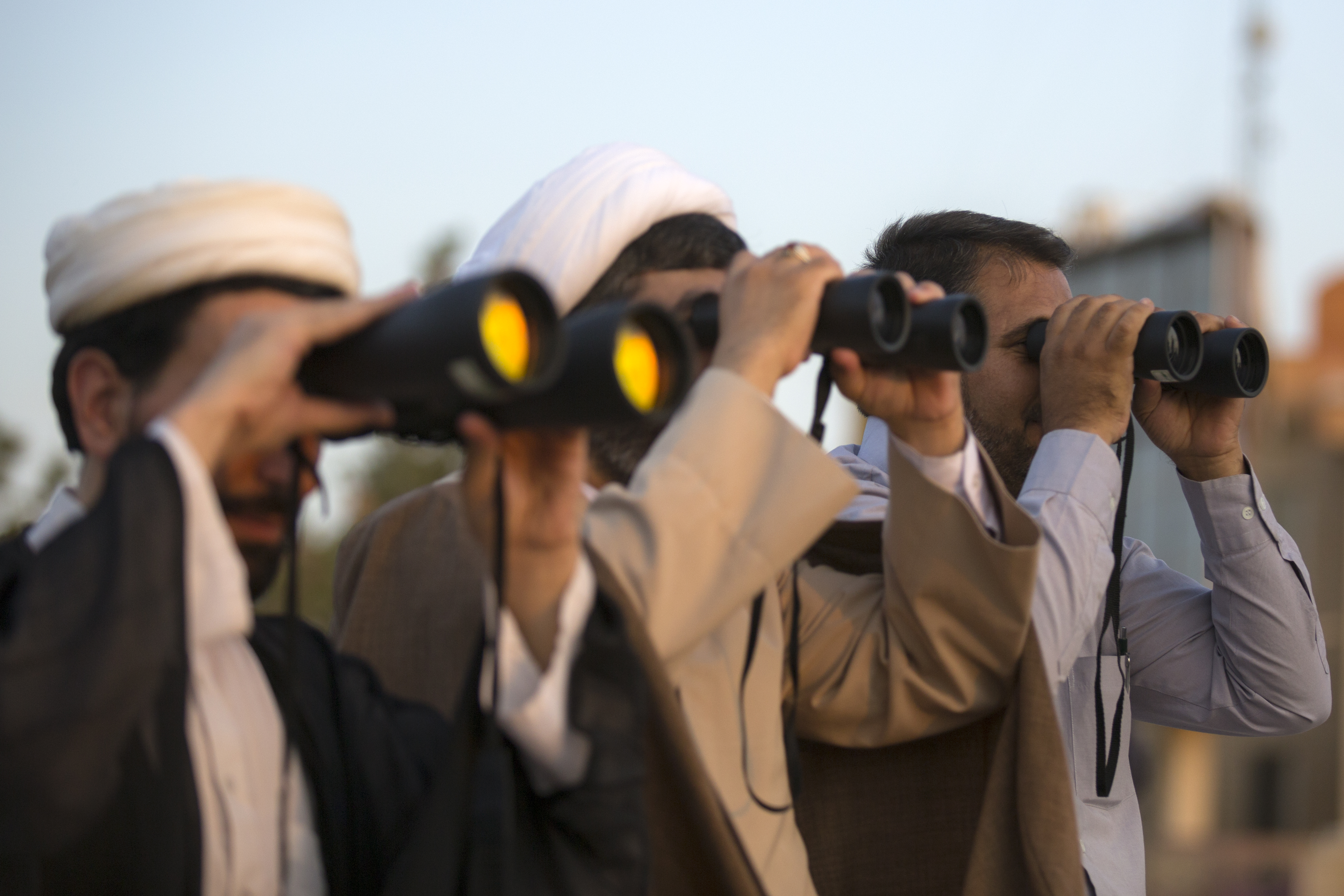
In Iran, scholars and people observe the appearance of the Ramadan crescent on the 29th of Sha'ban.

The holy month of Ramadan is a special and important time for Iranian Muslims. This month is characterized by religious and cultural worship and traditions that span generations and vary from one nation to another.

== Overview ==
During the month of Ramadan in Iran, Muslims observe a fast from dawn to dusk, abstaining from food, drink, and smoking during fasting hours. Fasting is a spiritual experience that promotes self-discipline and closeness to God.

Iftar is an important meal during Ramadan in Iran. Suhoor (the pre-dawn meal) is prepared before the start of the day's fast, and people are concerned with the types of dishes for suhoor and iftar. In Iran, Tarawih prayers are also held in mosques, where Muslims come together to perform congregational prayers and recite the Holy Quran . The nights in Ramadan are filled with worship, glorification, and supplication.

Social traditions and customs are an important part of Ramadan in Iran . Greetings and congratulations are exchanged between family, friends, and neighbors, and gifts and visits are made during this holy month.

== Special Ramadan activity ==
Ramadan procedures in Iran are slightly different from some other countries. Shops and restaurants are closed during the daytime fasting hours, and activity in the streets and shops resumes in the evening after the daytime fast ends.

== Iranian food in Ramadan ==
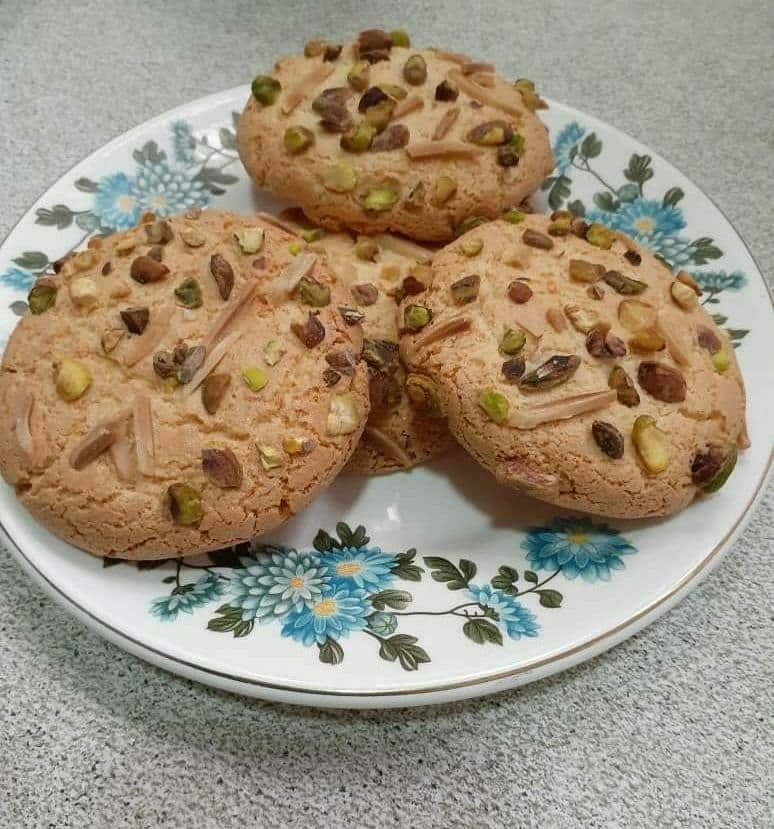
Iranian sweets.

Iran is also famous for serving some traditional foods and sweets during Ramadan. Some examples of Iranian Ramadan desserts include Shirin Polo, a rice dish sweetened with saffron and nuts, Iranian Halva, a dessert made with flour, sugar, butter, and nuts, Zalabia and Lokma Qadi. A light iftar is also popular around sunset, which typically consists of cheese, hot bread, and a cup of light tea.

== See also ==
- Ramadan in Russia
- Ramadan in Turkey
