= 1986–87 Wills Cup =

- Dates: 25 September 1986 – 10 October 1986
- Administrator(s): BCCP
- Cricket format: Limited overs (List A)
- Tournament format(s): Round-robin and knockout
- Champions: Habib Bank (2nd title)
- Participants: 10
- Matches: 23
- Player of the series: Manzoor Elahi
- Most runs: Ijaz Ahmed (212)
- Most wickets: Iqbal Qasim (10)

The 1986–87 Wills Cup was the sixth edition of the Wills Cup, which was the premiere domestic limited overs cricket competition in Pakistan and afforded List A status. Ten teams participated in the competition which was held from 25 September 1986 to 10 October 1986.

== Venues ==
Venues for the Wills Cup 1986-87

== Group stage ==
=== Group A ===
==== Points Table ====
Team	Pld	W	L	NR	NRR	Pts
Agriculture Development Bank	4	4	0	0	+5.263	16
PIA	4	3	1	0	+5.084	12
National Bank	4	2	2	0	+4.834	8
KarachiMCB	4	1	3	0	-4.397	4
House Building Finance	4	0	4	0	-3.852	0

=== Group B ===
==== Points Table ====
Team	Pld	W	L	NR	NRR	Pts
United Bank	5	4	0	0	+4.180	18
Habib Bank	5	3	2	0	+4.405	12
Lahore City	5	3	2	0	+4.122	12
Pakistan Automobiles Corporation	5	1	2	1	+3.857	8
Railways	5	1	3	1	-4.311	6

== Semi-finals ==
6 October
Scorecard

Habib Bank Limited; 277/2 (50 overs)	v	Agriculture Development Bank; 149 (43 overs)
Ijaz Ahmed 123; Zakir Khan 1/54 (10 overs)		Mansoor Rana 45; Anwar Miandad 3/17 (7 overs)

Habib Bank Limited won by 128 runs
Gaddafi Stadium, Lahore
Umpires: Amanullah Khan and Mian Aslam
Player of the match: Ijaz Ahmed (HBL)

- Agriculture Development Bank won the toss and elected to field.

6 October
Scorecard

United Bank Limited; 209/8 (50 overs)	v	Pakistan International Airlines; 189 (48.3 overs)
Mudassar Nazar 64; Rashid Khan 3/34 (10 overs)		Zaheer Abbas 49; Saleem Jaffar 3/31 (9.3 overs)

United Bank Limited won by 20 runs
Shahi Bagh Stadium, Peshawar
Player of the match: Mudassar Nazar (UBL)

- United Bank Limited won the toss and elected to bat.

== Final ==
20 September
Scorecard

United Bank Limited; 154 (48.1 overs)	v	Habib Bank Limited; 155/7 (49.2 overs)
Moin-ul-Atiq 78; Akram Raza 3/38 (10 overs)		Anwar Miandad 54; Saleem Jaffar 3/30 (10 overs)

Habib Bank Limited won by 3 wickets
Gaddafi Stadium, Lahore
Umpires: Khiser Hayat and Mahboob Shah
Player of the match: Anwar Miandad (HB)

- United Bank Limited won the toss and elected to bat.
