= Pentangular Tournament =

Pentangular Tournament may refer to:

- A five-team knock-out first-class cricket tournament held in the West Indies in 1961. The competition eventually evolved into the tournament now (2007) known as the Carib Beer Cup
- An expansion of the Bombay Quadrangular, a first-class cricket tournament held in India. The Pentangular was held from 1937-38 until 1945-46, after which the Bombay tournament was discontinued
- Pentangular Trophy; a first-class cricket tournament held intermittently in Pakistan between 1973–74 and 2011–12.
