= International cricket in 1992 =

International cricket season

The 1992 International cricket season was from May 1992 to September 1992.

== Season overview ==
International tours
| Start date | Home team | Away team | Results [Matches] | | | |
| Start date | Home team | Away team | Test | ODI | FC | LA |
|---|---|---|---|---|---|---|
| 20 May 1992 | England | Pakistan | 1–2 [5] | 4–1 [5] | — | — |
| 15 August 1992 | Sri Lanka | Australia | 0–1 [3] | 2–1 [3] | — | — |

== May ==
=== Pakistan in England ===
Texaco Trophy - ODI series
| No. | Date | Home captain | Away captain | Venue | Result |
|---|---|---|---|---|---|
| ODI 756 | 20 May | Graham Gooch | Javed Miandad | Lord's, London | England by 79 runs |
| ODI 757 | 22 May | Graham Gooch | Javed Miandad | Kennington Oval, London | England by 39 runs |
| ODI 759 | 20 August | Graham Gooch | Saleem Malik | Trent Bridge, Nottingham | England by 198 runs |
| ODI 760 | 22 August | Alec Stewart | Saleem Malik | Lord's, London | Pakistan by 3 runs |
| ODI 761 | 24 August | Graham Gooch | Rameez Raja | Old Trafford Cricket Ground, Manchester | England by 6 wickets |
Test series
| No. | Date | Home captain | Away captain | Venue | Result |
| Test 1189 | 4–8 June | Graham Gooch | Javed Miandad | Edgbaston Cricket Ground, Birmingham | Match drawn |
| Test 1190 | 18–21 June | Graham Gooch | Javed Miandad | Lord's, London | Pakistan by 2 wickets |
| Test 1191 | 2–7 July | Graham Gooch | Javed Miandad | Old Trafford Cricket Ground, Manchester | Match drawn |
| Test 1192 | 23–26 July | Graham Gooch | Javed Miandad | Headingley Cricket Ground, Leeds | England by 6 wickets |
| Test 1193 | 6–9 August | Graham Gooch | Javed Miandad | Kennington Oval, London | Pakistan by 10 wickets |

== August ==
=== Australia in Sri Lanka ===
ODI series
| No. | Date | Home captain | Away captain | Venue | Result |
|---|---|---|---|---|---|
| ODI 758 | 15 August | Arjuna Ranatunga | Allan Border | P Sara Oval, Colombo | Sri Lanka by 4 wickets |
| ODI 762 | 4 September | Arjuna Ranatunga | Allan Border | R Premadasa Stadium, Colombo | Sri Lanka by 5 wickets |
| ODI 763 | 5 September | Arjuna Ranatunga | Allan Border | R Premadasa Stadium, Colombo | Australia by 5 wickets |
Test series
| No. | Date | Home captain | Away captain | Venue | Result |
| Test 1194 | 17–22 August | Arjuna Ranatunga | Allan Border | Sinhalese Sports Club Ground, Colombo | Australia by 16 runs |
| Test 1195 | 28 August-2 September | Arjuna Ranatunga | Allan Border | R Premadasa Stadium, Colombo | Match drawn |
| Test 1196 | 8–13 September | Arjuna Ranatunga | Allan Border | Tyronne Fernando Stadium, Moratuwa | Match drawn |
