= Anwar Miandad =

Pakistani cricketer

Personal information
- Full name: Anwar Miandad
- Born: 11 March 1960 (age 66); Karachi, Sindh, Pakistan
- Batting: Right-handed
- Bowling: Slow left-arm orthodox
- Role: All-rounder

Domestic team information
- Years: Team
- 1979/80–1981/82: Industrial Development Bank
- 1982/83–1996/97: Habib Bank Limited

Career statistics
Competition	First-class	List A
Matches	141	82
Runs scored	5,018	1,177
Batting average	24.35	23.54
100s/50s	4/26	0/5
Top score	123	91*
Balls bowled	3,827	1,049
Wickets	51	36
Bowling average	39.27	21.80
5 wickets in innings	0	1
10 wickets in match	0	0
Best bowling	4/22	7/20
Catches/stumpings	82/–	20/–
- Source: CricketArchive, 16 November 2022

Anwar Miandad (born 11 March 1960) is a Pakistani former first-class cricketer who played mainly for the Habib Bank Limited cricket team. He is a younger brother of Pakistan's leading Test run scorer Javed Miandad and had two other brothers (Sohail Miandad and Bashir Miandad) play Quaid-i-Azam Trophy matches. An all-rounder, he also took the field for Karachi and the Industrial Development Bank of Pakistan during his career.

Miandad played as a right-handed middle order batsman and bowled useful slow left-arm orthodox spin. He was a member of two Patron's Trophy final winning sides with Habib Bank Limited, the first under Javed's captaincy in 1987/88. The other was in 1991/92 when they drew with National Bank of Pakistan but were awarded the trophy because of a superior first innings score, in which Miandad contributed 67 runs. He captained Habib Bank Limited twice during the 1995/96 Patron's Trophy.

Despite appearing in 141 first-class matches, Miandad only scored four centuries and never more than one in a single season. He was also run out for 99 in an innings, against Pakistan National Shipping Corporation in 1990/91.

In a Wills Cup limited-overs match for Habib Bank Limited against Lahore City at Peshawar in the 1988/89 season, Miandad had recorded bowling figures of 7 for 20. His bowling record at the time was the best ever in Pakistani domestic limited-overs cricket.

A reliable fielder, Miandad won the 'Fielder of the Tournament' award in the 1982/83 Wills Cup.
