= Ramadan T20 Cup =

Cricket league in Pakistan

- Administrator: Pakistan Cricket Board
- Cricket format: Twenty20
- Tournament format(s): Round-robin and knockout
- Host: Karachi
- Champions: Habib Bank Limited
- Participants: 10
- Matches: 23
- Most runs: Mohammad Yasin (230)
- Most wickets: Salman Saeed (9)

The Ramadan T20 Cup, sponsored as the Advance Telecom Ramadan T20 Cup, was a one-off a professional Twenty20 cricket tournament held in Karachi, Pakistan from 6 to 25 July 2013, during the holy month of Ramadan. The cup was contested by different departments as opposed to the regional associations that competed in the Faysal Bank T20 Cup.

The tournament was contested by ten teams through a round-robin group stage, followed by semi-finals and a final.

Habib Bank Limited won the cup in a one-over eliminator, after the final against Pakistan International Airlines resulted in a tie.

== Venue ==
All 23 matches were played at the National Stadium in Karachi.

City	Venue	Capacity
Karachi, Sindh	National Stadium	34,228
Ramadan T20 Cup is located in Pakistan		

== Group stage ==
=== Tables ===
Group A
Team	Pld	W	L	NR	NRR	Pts
Pakistan International Airlines (Q)	4	2	1	1	+0.218	5
Habib Bank Limited (Q)	4	2	2	0	+0.610	4
United Bank Limited	4	2	2	0	+0.145	4
State Bank of Pakistan	4	2	2	0	-0.294	4
Water and Power Development Authority	4	1	2	1	-0.769	3

Group B
Team	Pld	W	L	NR	NRR	Pts
Port Qasim Authority (Q)	4	3	1	0	+0.116	6
Khan Research Laboratories (Q)	4	3	1	0	-0.013	6
Zarai Taraqiati Bank	4	2	2	0	+0.183	4
Sui Northern Gas Pipelines	4	1	2	1	+0.476	3
National Bank of Pakistan	4	0	3	1	-1.173	1

(Q) The top two teams in each group advanced to the knockout stage

=== Results ===
All times shown are in Pakistan Standard Time (UTC+05).

==== Group A ====
6 July
17:00 (D/N)
Scorecard

Habib Bank Limited; 137/7 (20 overs)	v	United Bank Limited; 159/4 (20 overs)
Hasan Raza 50 (39); Shabbir Ahmed 2/30 (4 overs)		Adnan Baig 54 (55); Ehsan Adil 2/26 (4 overs)

United Bank Limited won by 22 runs
National Stadium, Karachi
Umpires: Ahmed Shahab and Majid Hussain
Player of the match: Asif Ali (United Bank Limited)

- Habib Bank Limited won the toss and elected to field
- Asad Baig and Behram Khan (Habib Bank Limited), Mohammad Zubair and Saad Sukhail (United Bank Limited) made their T20 debut.

6 July
21:00
Scorecard

Pakistan International Airlines; 154/5	v	State Bank of Pakistan; 155/1
Usman Saeed 41 (29); Shoaib Malik 2/22 (4 overs)		Agha Sabir 65 (47); Kashif Siddiq 1/24 (2 overs)

Pakistan International Airlines won by 9 wickets
National Stadium, Karachi
Player of the match: Shoaib Malik

7 July
17:00
Scorecard

Pakistan International Airlines; 129/9	v	United Bank Limited; 133/6
Faisal Iqbal 48 (48); Shabbir Ahmed 5/23		Faisal Athar 38 (39); Salman Saeed 2/25

United Bank Limited won by 4 wickets
National Stadium, Karachi
Player of the match: Shabbir Ahmed

7 July
21:00
Scorecard

Habib Bank Limited; 162/4	v	Water and Power Development Authority; 108
Younis Khan 54 (39); Zulfiqar Babar 2/27		Sohaib Maqsood 40 (34); Asad Baig 4/12

Habib Bank Limited won by 54 runs
National Stadium, Karachi
Player of the match: Asad Baig

8 July
17:00
Scorecard

State Bank of Pakistan; 139/8	v	Water and Power Development Authority; 136/7
Usman Saeed 38 (40); Mohammad Mudassar 3/15		Shoaib Nasir 26 (31); Mohammad Waheed 3/31

State Bank of Pakistan won by 3 runs
National Stadium, Karachi
Umpires: Saqib Khan and Qaiser Waheed

- Mohammad Afzal (State Bank of Pakistan) Shoaib Nasir and Asif Ali (Water and Power Development Authority) made their T20 debut.

8 July
21:00
Scorecard

Habib Bank Limited	v	Pakistan International Airlines

Pakistan International Airlines won by 5 wickets
National Stadium, Karachi

9 July
23:30
Scorecard

Pakistan International Airlines	v	Water and Power Development Authority

No result
National Stadium, Karachi

10 July
23:30
Scorecard

State Bank of Pakistan	v	United Bank Limited

State Bank of Pakistan won by 9 runs
National Stadium, Karachi

11 July
23:30
Scorecard

Habib Bank Limited	v	State Bank of Pakistan

Habib Bank Limited won by 6 wickets
National Stadium, Karachi

==== Group B ====
13 July
22:30
Scorecard

National Bank of Pakistan; 150/7 (20 overs)	v	Port Qasim Authority; 154/1 (17.4 overs)
Kamran Akmal 47 (37); Shahzaib Ahmed 2/28 (4 overs)		Shahzaib Hasan 68* (46); Faisal Tahir 1/29 (2 overs)

Port Qasim Authority won by 9 wickets
National Stadium, Karachi
Umpires: Aftab Gillani and Saqib Khan
Player of the match: Shahzaib Hasan (Port Qasim Authority)

- Bilal Munir, Faisal Tahir and Usman Qadir (National Bank of Pakistan) made their Twenty20 debuts

14 July
22:30
Scorecard

Sui Northern Gas Pipelines Limited	v	Zarai Taraqiati Bank

Zarai Taraqiati Bank Limited won by 8 wickets
National Stadium, Karachi

== Knockout stage ==
Semifinals
A1	Pakistan International Airlines	149/3 (19.2 overs)
B2	Khan Research Laboratories	146/5 (20 overs)
B1	Port Qasim Authority	134/9 (20 overs)
A2	Habib Bank Limited	148/7 (20 overs)

Final
SF1	Pakistan International Airlines	158 (20 overs)
SF2	Habib Bank Limited	158 (20 overs)

=== Semi-finals ===
23 July
22:30
Scorecard

Pakistan International Airlines; 149/3 (19.2 overs)	v	Khan Research Laboratories; 146/5 (20 overs)
Shoaib Malik 63* (56); Rahat Ali 1/29 (4 overs)		Zain Abbas 91 (66); Salman Saeed 3/29 (4 overs)

Pakistan International Airlines won by 7 wickets
National Stadium, Karachi
Umpires: Zameer Haider and Shozab Raza
Player of the match: Shoaib Malik (Pakistan International Airlines)

- Pakistan International Airlines won the toss and elected to field

24 July
22:30
Scorecard

Port Qasim Authority; 134/9 (20 overs)	v	Habib Bank Limited; 148/7 (20 overs)
Khalid Latif 34 (33); Sarmad Anwar 3/26 (4 overs)		Hasan Raza 58* (42); Mohammad Talha 3/29 (4 overs)

Habib Bank Limited won by 14 runs
National Stadium, Karachi
Umpires: Ahsan Raza and Riazuddin
Player of the match: Hasan Raza (Habib Bank Limited)

- Habib Bank Limited won the toss and elected to bat

=== Final ===
25 July
22:30
Scorecard

Pakistan International Airlines; 158/7 (20 overs)	v	Habib Bank Limited; 158 (20 overs)
Faisal Iqbal 42 (40); Fahad Masood 2/27 (4 overs)		Imran Farhat 65 (36); Salman Saeed 3/29 (3 overs)

Match tied (Habib Bank Limited won the one-over eliminator)
National Stadium, Karachi
Umpires: Ahsan Raza and Shozab Raza
Player of the match: Imran Farhat (Habib Bank Limited)

- Habib Bank Limited won the toss and elected to bat
- Habib Bank Limited won the 2013 Advance Telecom Ramadan T20 Cup

== See also ==
- List of domestic Twenty20 cricket competitions
- Ramadan in Pakistan
