= National One-Day Championship =

National One Day Cup
- Countries: Pakistan
- Administrator: Pakistan Cricket Board
- Format: List A (one-day) cricket
- First edition: 1980–81
- Latest edition: 2018–19
- Tournament format: Round-robin groups and knockout
- Number of teams: 16
- Current champion: Habib Bank Limited

The National One Day Cup was the national domestic List A (one-day) cricket competition in Pakistan. Due to frequent reorganizations by the Pakistan Cricket Board, there have been, at different times, one or more competitions involving teams representing either regional associations or departments (Note: The top level of domestic cricket in Pakistan was historically played by teams representing regional cricket associations (cities, districts, etc.) and departments, which were owned and run by corporations, institutions or government departments.) (or a mix of the two), during the same season, resulting in multiple domestic one-day champions in those seasons.

== History ==
The first domestic one-day competitions in Pakistan were short-lived, starting with the PTV Trophy which was held in 1971-72, the Servis Cup which was held in 1974–75 and 1975–76. United Bank Limited (UBL) Trophy and the Habib Bank Gold Cup were also held during this period. The first long-standing competition was the Wills Cup, introduced in 1980–81, sponsored by the Pakistan Tobacco Company. Except for 1984–85, it was played every season until 1998–99 when it was renamed the Tissot Cup.

In 2000–01, the competition was split into the One Day National Tournament, with one tournament for regional associations and one for departments. Since then, the competition has fluctuated between single and separate competitions and has had many different names, reflecting various sponsorship agreements.

== Winners ==
Season	Winner(s)	
Wills Cup
1980–81	Pakistan International Airlines	
1981–82	Pakistan International Airlines	
1982–83	Pakistan International Airlines	
1983–84	Habib Bank Limited	
1984–85	Not held	
1985–86	Pakistan International Airlines	
1986–87	Habib Bank Limited	
1987–88	Pakistan International Airlines	
1988–89	United Bank Limited	
1989–90	Habib Bank Limited	
1990–91	Habib Bank Limited	
1991–92	Habib Bank Limited	
1992–93	National Bank of Pakistan	
1993–94	Habib Bank Limited	
1994–95	National Bank of Pakistan	
Wills Kings Cup
1995–96	Pakistan International Airlines	
Wills Cup
1996–97	Allied Bank Limited	
1997–98	Allied Bank Limited	
Tissot Cup
1998–99	Allied Bank Limited	
1999–2000	Pakistan International Airlines	
One Day National Tournament
2000–01	Associations: Karachi Whites	Departments: Habib Bank Limited
2001–02	Pakistan International Airlines	
Patron's Cup
2002–03	Pakistan International Airlines	
	Quaid-e-Azam Cup	Patron's Cup
2003–04	Faisalabad Wolves	Habib Bank Limited
	ABN-AMRO One Day Cup	ABN-AMRO Patron's Cup
2004–05	Lahore Lions	Water and Power Development Authority
2005–06	Faisalabad Wolves	Habib Bank Limited
2006–07	Peshawar Panthers	National Bank of Pakistan
ABN-AMRO One Day Cup
2007–08	Sui Northern Gas Pipelines Limited	
RBS One Day Cup
2008–09	Pakistan International Airlines	
2009–10	Sui Northern Gas Pipelines Limited	
Faisal Bank One Day Cup
2010–11	Habib Bank Limited	
2011–12	Pakistan International Airlines	
	Faisal Bank One Day Cup	President's One Day Cup
2012–13	Karachi Zebras and Lahore Lions (Note: Title shared, play abandoned in the final.)	Sui Northern Gas Pipelines Limited
2013–14	Karachi Dolphins	Khan Research Laboratories and National Bank of Pakistan
President's Gold One Day Cup
2014–15	State Bank of Pakistan	
National One Day Cup
2015–16	National Bank of Pakistan and Islamabad (Note: Title shared, no play in the final.)	
	Regional One Day Cup	Departmental One Day Cup
2016–17	Peshawar	Habib Bank Limited
2017–18	Karachi Whites	United Bank Limited
Quaid-e-Azam One Day Cup
2018–19	Habib Bank Limited	

== See also ==
National T20 Cup
