= Harunur Rashid (cricketer) =

Bangladeshi cricketer (born 1968)

Personal information
- Full name: Mohammad Harunur Rashid
- Born: 30 November 1968 (age 57); Mymensingh, East Pakistan
- Nickname: Liton
- Batting: Right-handed
- Bowling: Leg break

International information
- National side: Bangladesh (1988)
- ODI debut (cap 15): 27 October 1988 v India
- Last ODI: 2 November 1988 v Sri Lanka

Career statistics
Competition	Tests	ODIs
Matches	–	2
Runs scored	–	–
Batting average	–	–
100s/50s	0/0	0/0
Top score	–	–
Balls bowled	–	–
Wickets	–	–
Bowling average	–	–
5 wickets in innings	–	–
10 wickets in match	–	–
Best bowling	–	–
Catches/stumpings	–/–	–/–
- Source: ESPNcricinfo, 13 February 2006

Mohammad Harunur Rashid (Bengali: মোহাম্মদ হারুনুর রশীদ; born 30 November 1968), also known as Liton, is a Bangladeshi former cricketer who played in 2 ODIs in 1988.

Later that year, he played in the Asia Cup in Bangladesh. Unfortunately, for the opener, his experience in full ODIs wasn't very happy. He bagged ducks against India and Sri Lanka.

== 1989/90 season ==
To his credit, Harunur Rashid bounced back from these setbacks and enjoyed a highly successful 1989–90. Playing in front of his home crowd at Noakhali, he scored 134 runs against Deccan Blues He followed this with 670 runs against Denmark at Dhaka in February 1990. Playing for Abahani KC, he dominated the 2nd wicket partnership of 86 with the skipper Gazi Ashraf Lipu. Just the next day, he scored 50 against the same opposition, this time playing for BCCB(White). He and his fellow opener Zahid Razzak put on 105 for the 1st wicket.

On the basis of these performances, he was included in the Bangladesh team for the 1990 ICC Trophy. He showed excellent form in the practice match against Academic Bold Club (Denmark). He scored 666, & shared a massive 415 run opening partnership with Nurul Abedin Nobel. In the main Trophy, he played against Fiji & Denmark, scoring 10 & 6 respectively.

== In the 1990s ==
He was a dominant figure in domestic cricket throughout the 90s. With his aggressive batting ideally suited to One Day game. he was highly successful in the domestic arena. He also had some chances at the international level.

In Feb. 1992, he scored 40 against the visiting West Bengal side, in the process sharing a 90 run opening stand with Jahangir Alam. A year later, he scored 45 against the Karachi Gymkhana side. After remaining in the fringes for a number of years, he finally got his recall to the main national team for the ACC trophy in Malaysia in September 1996. His top score of 66* came against Brunei in the group stages.

Although he was overlooked for the ICC Trophy team in March 1997, he was made the captain of the 'A' team that took part in the 1997 Wills Cup in Pakistan. Although the Bangladesh 'A' team lost all their 4 group games, the young Bangladeshi cricketers gained valuable experiences playing some world class cricketers. Individually, Liton scored 76 runs at an average of 19.00. His top score of 43 came against The Agricultural Development Bank (Pakistan) at the National Stadium, Karachi. There, Liton shared a 111 run 2nd wicket stand with Shahriar Hossain (76). His last international match was against England 'A' at Dhaka, in October 1999. And he bowed out in style, scoring a stylish 55 for his side, before being dismissed by the leggie Schofield.

Harunur Rashid: Major Batting performances in International Cricket
Date	Opposition	Venue	Score
19 Jan 1988	Hong Kong Governor's XI	Hong Kong	74
28 Feb 1988	Pakistan (U-19)	Victoria(Australia)	38
17 Feb 1990	Danish XI	Dhaka	65
18 Feb 1990	Danish XI	Dhaka	50
15 May 1990	AcaDemic Bold Club, Denmark	Denmark	127
15 Feb 1992	West Bengal	Dhaka	40
1 April 1993	Karachi Airlines Gymkhana	Sylhet	45
8 Sep 1993	Brunei	KL(Malaysia)	66*
2 March 1997	ADB(Pakistan)	National Stadium(Karachi)	43
23 Oct 1999	England 'A'	Dhaka	55
