= Imran Khan (book) =

1994 biography by Ivo Tennant

- Author: Ivo Tennant
- Language: English
- Subject: Imran Khan; Cricket
- Genre: Biography
- Publisher: H. F. & G. Witherby
- Publication date: 1994
- Publication place: United Kingdom
- Media type: Print
- Pages: 205
- ISBN: 978-0-85493-228-3
- Dewey Decimal: 796.3580924

Imran Khan is a 1994 biography by Ivo Tennant about Pakistani cricketer Imran Khan. Published by H. F. & G. Witherby in London, the book was written with Khan's cooperation and traces his cricket career through Pakistan's victory in the 1992 Cricket World Cup. A reprint edition was later issued by Gollancz/Witherby in 1995.

== Synopsis ==
Tennant's biography charts Khan's exploits on the field in detail, which resulted in Pakistan's triumph in the 1992 Cricket World Cup. The book also examines the controversy surrounding Khan's public image, including his relationships with teammates such as Javed Miandad, his difficulties with the press in Pakistan, and his experiences in English county cricket.

== Reception ==
In The Spectator, Frank Keating described the book as "another first-rate and fondly diligent job by Ivo Tennant" while discussing the controversy over ball tampering in county and international cricket.

Reviewing Christopher Sandford's later 2009 biography of Khan, Stuart Wark of Cricket Web wrote that Tennant's Imran Khan had previously been acknowledged as the definitive biography of Khan and remained "an excellent book", though he considered Sandford's work superior because it covered the subsequent two decades of Khan's life.
