= Younis Khan =

Pakistani cricket coach and former cricketer

Younis Khan PP SI
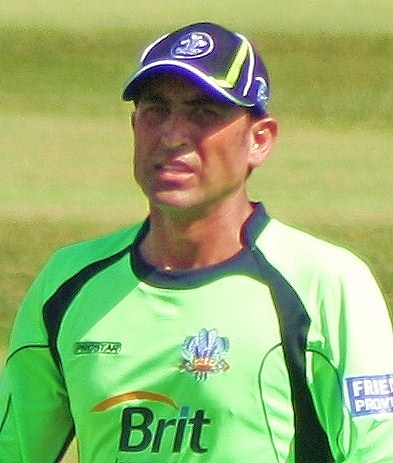
- Younis Khan in 2010

Personal information
- Full name: Mohammad Younis Khan
- Born: 29 November 1977 (age 48); Mardan, Khyber Pakhtunkhwa, Pakistan
- Height: 5 ft 11 in (180 cm)
- Batting: Right-handed
- Bowling: Right-arm medium
- Role: Middle-order batsman

International information
- National side: Pakistan (2000–2017)
- Test debut (cap 159): 26 February 2000 v Sri Lanka
- Last Test: 14 May 2017 v West Indies
- ODI debut (cap 131): 13 February 2000 v Sri Lanka
- Last ODI: 11 November 2015 v England
- ODI shirt no.: 75
- T20I debut (cap 11): 28 August 2006 v England
- Last T20I: 30 December 2010 v New Zealand

Domestic team information
- Years: Team
- 1998/99–2004/05: Peshawar
- 1999/00–2013/14: Habib Bank Limited
- 2005: Nottinghamshire
- 2006: Peshawar Panthers
- 2007: Yorkshire (squad no. 75)
- 2008: Rajasthan Royals
- 2008/09: South Australia
- 2010: Surrey
- 2011/12–2015/16: Abbottabad Falcons

Career statistics
Competition	Test	ODI	T20I	FC
Matches	118	265	25	229
Runs scored	10,099	7,249	442	17,116
Batting average	52.05	31.24	22.10	49.90
100s/50s	34/33	7/48	0/2	56/64
Top score	313	144	51	313
Balls bowled	804	284	22	3,620
Wickets	9	3	3	44
Bowling average	54.55	90.33	6.00	48.18
5 wickets in innings	0	0	0	0
10 wickets in match	0	0	0	0
Best bowling	2/23	1/3	3/18	4/52
Catches/stumpings	139/–	135/–	12/–	243/–
Medal record
Men's Cricket
Representing Pakistan
T20 World Cup
Winner	2009 England and Wales
Runner-up	2007 South Africa
Asia Cup
Winner	2012 Bangladesh
- Source: ESPNcricinfo, 15 May 2017

Mohammad Younis Khan PP SI (Urdu: محمد یونس خان; Pashto: محمد یونس خان; born 29 November 1977) is a Pakistani professional cricket coach and former cricketer and captain of the Pakistan national cricket team in all three formats of the game, and is widely regarded as one of the greatest middle-order batsmen in Test cricket. Khan is the only Test cricketer in the history of the game to score a century in all 11 countries that have hosted Test matches. Younis Khan was a member of the Pakistan cricket team that won the 2012 Asia Cup. Under his Captaincy Pakistan won the 2009 World Twenty20.

Younis holds the record for the most runs and the most centuries scored by a Pakistani in Test cricket. He is the third Pakistani player to score 300 or more runs in an innings. He is one of a handful of Test batsman in the world with a century conversion ratio of over 50 percent, with 34 centuries and 33 fifties. He led Pakistan to their victory in the 2009 ICC World Twenty20, which was their first World Twenty20 title. On 23 April 2017, he became the first Pakistani and 13th batsmen ever to score 10,000 runs in Test cricket. He became the oldest and sixth fastest batsmen to reach the 10,000 run milestone in relation to innings played.

On 24 March 2010, Younis, along with teammate Mohammad Yousuf, was suspended from playing by the Pakistan Cricket Board following an inquiry report which suggested they were involved in breaches of discipline by inciting divisions within the team. The ban was lifted three months later. In a Test match against Australia beginning on 22 October 2014, Younis made his 25th and 26th centuries in the same match, becoming just the 6th Pakistani to do so. On 25 June 2015, Younis became the fifth Pakistani cricketer to play 100 Test matches and on 13 October 2015, he became Pakistan's highest run scorer in Test cricket, breaking Javed Miandad's record of 8,832 runs.

Younis retired from ODI cricket in November 2015. He retired from all forms of international cricket at the conclusion of the series against the West Indies in May 2017.

== Personal life ==
Younis married Amna on 30 March 2007. They have three children: two son and one daughter.

Younis had to deal with a number of deaths in his family during 2005 and 2006. In 2005, he had to fly back from a tour of Australia after his father died. Later in the year during England's tour to Pakistan, Younis' eldest brother, Mohammed Sharif Khan, who, in Younis's words, taught him how to play cricket, died aged 41 in a car accident in Ukraine. Another older brother, Farman Ali Khan was only 39 when he was killed in a car accident in Germany in December 2006.

Younis was batting in the second ODI against West Indies in Faisalabad when the news of his brother's death reached the team management. Younis only learned of the situation after he returned to the pavilion at the end of his innings. He immediately left for his hometown Mardan and did not participate in any of the remaining matches in that series.

Younis also mentioned his grief at the death of Bob Woolmer in March 2007 after Pakistan's exit from the World Cup. He stated that he saw Bob as a father figure after the loss of his own father and that he was able to share many personal thoughts with the cricket coach.

During a tour of the West Indies in May 2011, Younis was given permission to return home early due to the death of his elder brother Shamshad Khan in Germany.

He is known to enjoy fishing, when not playing cricket.

== Domestic career ==
=== Australian first-class cricket ===
In 2008–09, Younis played for the Southern Redbacks in Australia's domestic circuit on a short-term basis. He scored a century against Queensland Bulls in the first innings of a Sheffield shield match in Brisbane, which helped the Redbacks to win their first Shield match for a year.

=== County cricket ===
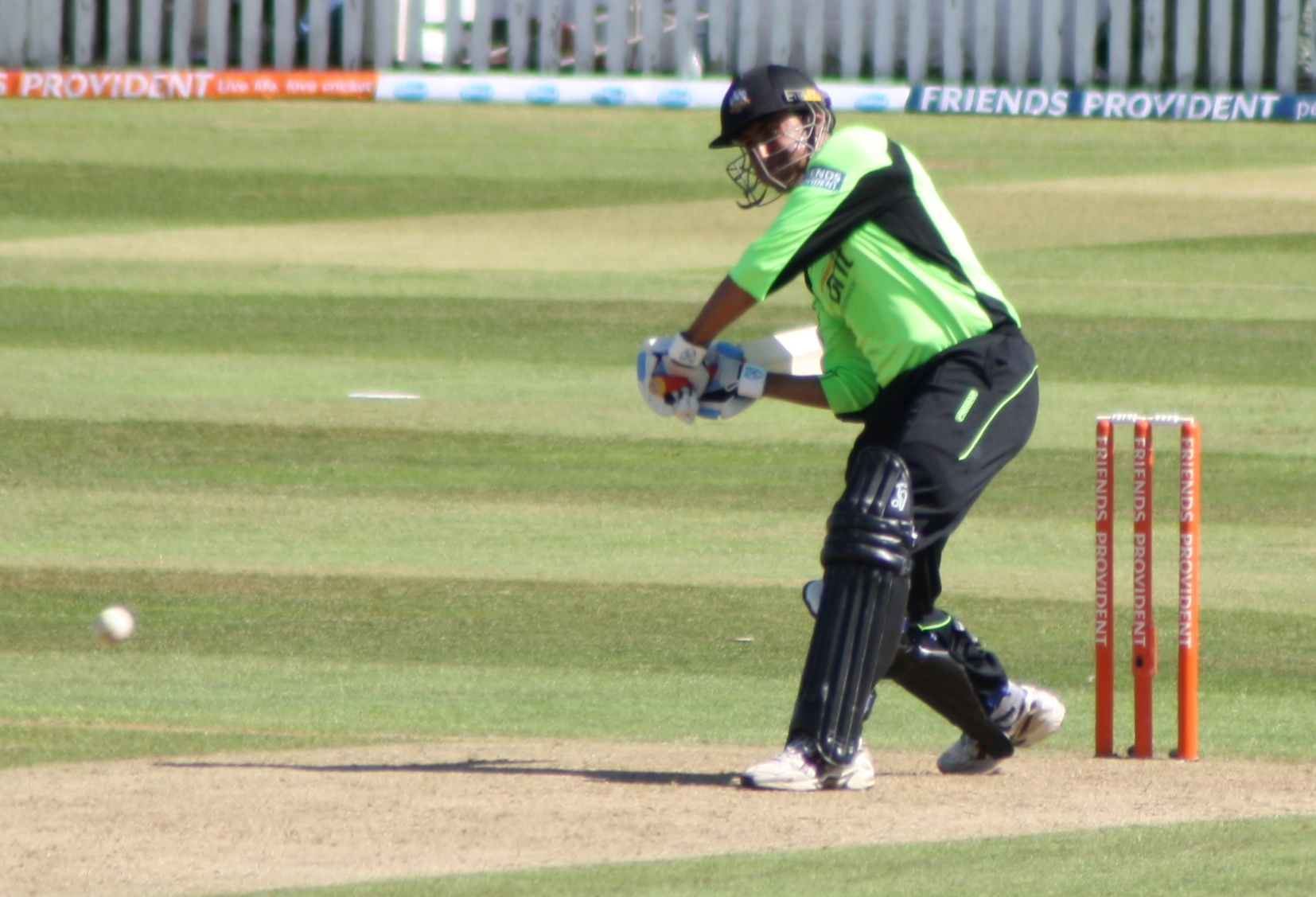
Younis batting for Surrey in the FPt20 in England.

In 2005, Younis played county cricket for Nottinghamshire in England. In the 2007 English domestic cricket season, played for Yorkshire County Cricket Club as an overseas player. In doing so he was the third overseas Asian cricketer to play for Yorkshire following Sachin Tendulkar and Yuvraj Singh, and was succeeded by Pakistani player Inzamam-ul-Haq.

On his County Championship debut for Yorkshire, he made a disappointing 4 runs from 4 balls in his first innings, being bowled by Rikki Clarke of Surrey, and just 12 in his second innings. However, on his one-day debut in the Friends Provident Trophy, Younis hit a superb 100 from 92 balls against Nottinghamshire to lead Yorkshire to victory.

He made his first County Championship century, 106 off 151 balls, for Yorkshire against Hampshire at the Rose Bowl in the third match of the season and followed it up with an unbeaten double hundred, 202 off 290 balls, in the second innings to steer Yorkshire to a confident declaration. In doing so, Younis became the first Yorkshire player to score a century and a double century in the same match. Younis also made a useful contribution bowling during Hampshire's second innings, picking up four wickets for just 52 runs, however despite his and the team's efforts the match ended in a draw. He repeated the feat of an unbeaten double century at Scarborough in a rain-affected drawn match with Kent. He played a superb innings to finish on 217* off just 252 balls with 18 fours and 6 sixes. He left Yorkshire following the 8-wicket drubbing of Glamorgan Dragons. However, the nature of the victory denied him the chance to sign off in a fitting matter as he was not required to bat.

He signed for Surrey for the 2010 season.

=== Indian Premier League ===
In 2008, Younis signed with the Indian Premier League and was drafted by the Rajasthan Royals for a bid of US$300,000. He however played only 1 match in the tournament against Kings XI Punjab and scored 1 run. He has not appeared in the IPL since.

=== Pakistan ===
He contributed as a mentor for Peshawar Zalmi in the 2017 PSL season and the 2018 PSL season.

In July 2018, he resigned from his roles of both captain and player of the United Bank Limited cricket team, after the United Bank Limited company decided to disband the team.

== International career ==
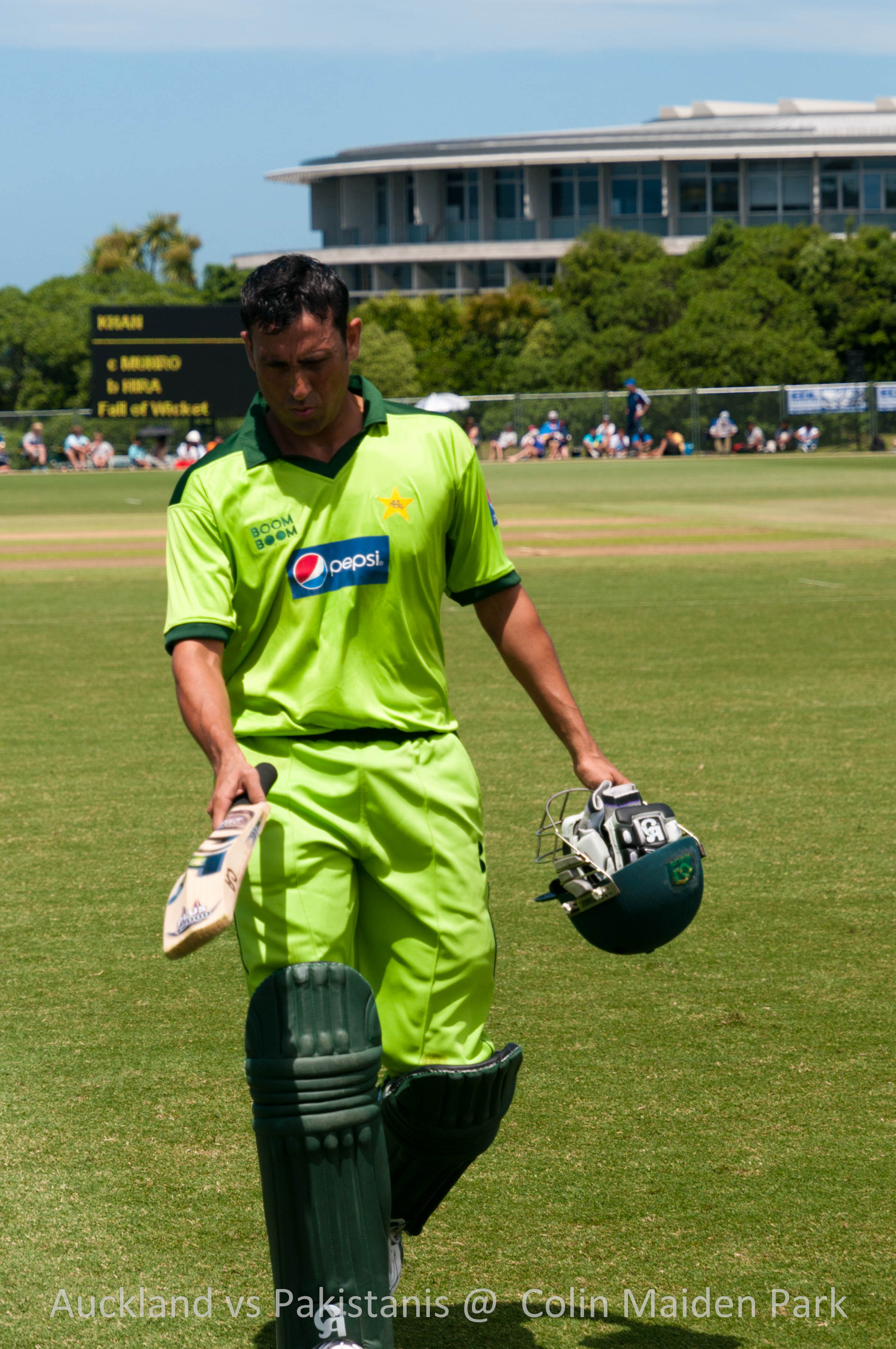
Yonis Khan playing for Pakistan in 2010

Younis Khan made his international debut in an ODI against Sri Lanka at Karachi in February 2000, and has since played over 250 ODIs for Pakistan. His Test debut came during the same tour in 2000 against Sri Lanka on 26 February 2000 and played in over 110 Test matches until retirement. Younis was one of the few batsmen who retained his place in the team after Pakistan's disastrous World Cup campaign in 2003, but lost it soon after due to a string of poor scores in the home series against Bangladesh and South Africa. He came back for the one-day series against India, but failed to cement a place in the Test team.

It was his return to the team in October 2004, at the pivotal one-down position, against Sri Lanka in Karachi that laid the groundwork for his emergence as a force in Pakistan cricket. Younis was the top run-getter in the disastrous 3–0 whitewash in Australia immediately after and on the tour of India, for which he was elevated as vice-captain. After a horror start to the series, he came back strongly, capping things off with 267 in the final Test. It was his highest Test score that came off 504 balls in the first innings, to set up a series levelling victory in Bangalore.

Apart from being an accomplished batsman, Younis is also a skilled slip fielder and a very occasional leg-spin bowler. Once, Craig McMillan hit Younis for 26 runs, 4 4 4 4 6 4 in an over, a then world record, during the 3rd Test at Westpac Trust Park, Hamilton. He has performed particularly well on foreign grounds, including on tours of Australia, India, England and Sri Lanka. In the six Tests he has played against India, Younis averages an exceptional 106, the highest average against India by a Pakistani cricketer. Apart from his 267 at Bangalore, Younis also made 147 at Kolkata in 2005 and a pair of centuries during India's trip to Pakistan in 2006. More importantly, the tour to India also showcased his potential as a future captain of Pakistan and his energetic and astute leadership impressed many people. Also in 2006, Younis made a century in the third Test against England at Headingley. On 22 January 2007, he scored a matchwinning unbeaten 67 in the 4th innings to guide Pakistan to victory over South Africa in Port Elizabeth. The five wicket win levelled the series at 1–1.

In 2005, he was one of the 15 nominees for the ICC Test Player of the Year. He is the second fastest Pakistani in terms of innings to reach 4000 Test runs, behind Javed Miandad. Younis reached the milestone in 87 innings, just one more than Sachin Tendulkar took.

For his performances in 2008, he was named in the World ODI XI by the ICC.

Younis Khan topped the ICC's Test Batting Rankings in February 2009 after an acclaimed innings of 313 in his first Test as captain, in the process of helping save the match for Pakistan. Younis ranking score of 880 is the third highest achieved by a Pakistani batsmen after Mohammad Yousuf (933), Javed Miandad (885) and just ahead of Inzamam-ul-Haq (870).

=== Captaincy situation ===
His ODI captaincy first came during West Indies touring third ODI on 22 May 2005, where Pakistan won the match by 22 runs and sealed the series 3–0. He first led Pakistan Test team against the same West Indies tour in 2005, where regular captain Inzamam was given one-Test ban for showing dissent against India. In September 2006, he was offered the position of captain for the 2006 ICC Champions Trophy, following the suspension of Inzamam ul Haq. He turned down the offer, stating he did not want to be a "dummy captain". However, on the morning of 7 October 2006, the Pakistan Cricket Board announced that Khan would lead his team in the tournament. In the series, Pakistan won only one match and lost two, thus quit from the series in the league as well.

Following the resignation of Inzamam after the Pakistan's exit from the 2007 Cricket World Cup, Khan was offered the captaincy on a permanent basis, but he turned it down. He blamed the angry reaction by the Pakistani public to the team's early exit from the tournament.

Younis led his team to the ICC World Twenty20 title for the first time by beating Sri Lanka at Lord's. After the match, he stated that that was his last international twenty20 appearance.

After Pakistan's 2–1 defeat to Sri Lanka in 2009, PCB chairman Ijaz Butt appointed Younis Khan as the permanent captain of both the Test and ODI teams. The appointment became effective as of 27 January 2009. Shortly after accepting the post, Younis was quoted as saying, "I will try and fix things that aren't right at the moment... I want our team to be consistent above all, in everything we do and that will require everyone to put their hands up." He also went on to say that he had an excellent relationship with former captain Shoaib Malik and expected his full support. Younis went on to say that he expected full support from former captain Shoaib Malik whom he called a senior player in the team.

Khan resigned as captain on 13 October 2009 due to a parliamentary investigation into match fixing that was alleged to have taken place during his reign. Despite being cleared in the investigation, Khan said "Yes I have submitted my resignation because I am disgusted by these match-fixing allegations made against me and the team."

Khan also dropped a catch of Grant Elliott in the 2009 ICC Champions Trophy semi-final. He had a hair-line fracture in his finger prior to the match. Later PCB Chairman requested Khan to take back his resignation and Khan did it on his conditions. However, after captaining the team for a three-match series against New Zealand Younis took a break for Test matches in New Zealand and the series in Australia the captaincy was given to Mohammad Yousuf and since then Younis has not captained the national team.

Younis Khan's results in international matches
	Matches	Won	Lost	Drawn	Tied	No result
Test	118	46	45	27	0	–
ODI	265	149	109	-	-	7
T20I	25	17	8	–	-	-

=== Post-captaincy ===
Younis's career after he gave up the captaincy continued on a downwards spiral as he was banned on 10 March 2010. Pakistan Cricket Board announced that Younis Khan had been banned indefinitely for "infighting which brought down the whole team during the tour of Australia in January". His ban was however overturned three months later in June 2010. Despite being cleared of any wrongdoing, Younis was not selected for the series against England. Pakistan continued to suffer frequent batting collapses against England in Test cricket. This put the Pakistan Cricket Board under pressure to restore Younis to the game. Around the same time, Pakistani batsman and Test Captain Salman Butt was suspended on charges of being involved in spot-fixing. This resulted in several former captains including Moin Khan and Zaheer Abbas wanting Younis reinstated to the Test team as captain. However, the Pakistan Cricket Board did not clear Younis for selection on the tours of South Africa in 2010. Despite being the first-choice for captaincy, the selecting panel Mohsin Khan announced that Misbah-ul-Haq was recalled and made captain. Signs of an improvement in the relationship of the Pakistan Cricket Board and Younis began to emerge after the board contacted Younis to potentially be selected for the tour Against South Africa in October 2010.

On 31 August 2010, the Daily Telegraph in its news article mentioned that Younis Khan was associated with alleged match-fixer Mazhar Majeed. Younis threatened to sue the Daily Telegraph over the fact that they posted false information about Younis. The Daily Telegraph admitted that they incorrectly reported that Younis Khan was affiliated with Mazhar Majeed. After a full public apology by the Daily Telegraph, Younis dropped the defamation charges against the newspaper. The Pakistan Cricket Board subsequently announced that they had successfully reconciled with Younis and that they intended to use him on the tour of South Africa in October 2010 as a replacement for the injured Mohammad Yousuf.

On his comeback ODI against South Africa, Younis Khan scored 54 runs. Younis then confirmed a statement by Pakistan captain Rashid Latif that he had not apologised to the PCB for his actions. As he believed he had committed nothing wrong. He also stated that the PCB chairman Ijaz Butt did not ask Younis to apologise either. His on-field comeback went well when he scored 73 runs and anchored Pakistan's innings Pakistan eventually won the fourth ODI against South Africa by 1 wicket.

His first Test match in over 12 months also went well when he scored a century in the second innings of the first Test against South Africa this century along with a 168 run partnership with captain Misbah-ul-Haq allowed Pakistan to salvage a draw. Younis eventually finished unbeaten on 131. By the end of his innings of 131, it became Pakistan's highest score of all time while batting in the fourth innings with Pakistan at 343/3.

Younis played in the two-match Test series against New Zealand and Younis scored 23 in the first innings and was not required to bat in the second innings as Pakistan sealed a 10-wicket victory. During the first innings of the second Test match Younis was given caught incorrectly at short-leg when on 73. In the post-match interview Younis took the view that "umpires are humans they make mistakes but they should reduce the errors they make, also he called for the Umpire Decision Review System to be used in all Test matches so that if an error is made it can be referred".

Younis confirmed that he was available to play in all three-formats of the game. He also announced that he was no longer in the race for the captaincy After announcing his comeback to Twenty20 cricket Younis was selected for the three match Twenty20 series against New Zealand in December 2010. Younis played in all three-matches but struggled for form.

Younis Khan's Test cricket record
	Matches	Runs	Best	Average	100s	50s
Home	19	1898	313	59.31	7	5
Away	68	5486	267	50.33	16	18
Neutral	28	2593	213	55.17	11	9

=== Through ranks and records ===
On 9 July 2014, Younis has been recalled in one day team for the Sri Lanka tour of Pakistan.

Younis Khan made 177 runs in the first innings of the first Test as Pakistan went on to score 451 runs. He was involved in two hundred-run partnerships as he went on to make a new record for most hundred run partnerships (51), beating the previous record of Javed Miandad (50). His performance was praised as he came in to bat at a very difficult time with the score being just 19/2 and played a major role in helping Pakistan post a commanding total. He was named in the Test XI of the year by Cricbuzz.

His knock of 200* against Zimbabwe at Harare was nominated to be one of the best Test batting performance of the year 2013 by ESPNcricinfo.

Younis surpassed Sir Donald Bradman's haul in his 101st Test match by scoring his 30th Test century (171*) against Sri Lanka in third and final Test at the Pallekele International Cricket Stadium in July 2015. With this century, Younis Khan became first batsman in the Test cricket history to score five centuries in the fourth innings of a Test match, surpassing the earlier record of four centuries by Sunil Gavaskar, Ricky Ponting.

For his performances in 2015, he was named in the World Test XI by the ICC.

Younis also completed 50 centuries and 15,000 runs in first-class cricket with this ton. Pakistan successfully chased a total of 377 runs in fourth innings against Sri Lanka in the third Test match. Younis became 12th batsman to score 30 Test centuries, after Indian legend Sunil Gavaskar first scored 30 Test centuries in 1983.

=== Contract issue ===
Younis had been demoted from A category contract to B category contract by Pakistan Cricket Board. This sparked a media controversy as analysts, former players and cricket fans expressed outrage against the decision with many stating that a player of Younis' stature does not deserve to be treated like this. Eventually the Board gave in to the pressure and Younis was promoted back to A category.

=== Retirement ===
After winning T20I trophy in 2009 ICC World Twenty20, Younis announced that it was his last international Twenty20 appearance by citing, "This is my last Twenty20 game [for Pakistan], so I am retiring from T20 internationals," Younis said, "I am now 31, I am old for this kind of cricket." No immediate announcement was made as to the identity of his successor as 20-over captain. On 29 July 2009, it was confirmed that Shahid Afridi would succeed him as the Twenty20 Captain.

"During my 15 year long association with ODI cricket, I always tried my best to play positive cricket for my team both as captain and as a player. But now I feel that the time has come when I should call it a day from one day cricket."

— Younis Khan

However, after Younis returned to the national setup, he announced that he was willing to play Twenty20 cricket for Pakistan as a senior batsman.

On 11 November 2015, Younis announced his retirement from ODI format saying that the opening match of the Pakistan against England will be his last one. He scored only 9 runs in last ODI.Younis Khan Played 264 One Day matches scoring 7240 runs. Younis is currently sixth on the list of highest run getters for Pakistan in ODI cricket. He scored seven hundreds and 48 fifties with an average of 31.34.

At the age of 39, Younis announced his intentions to retire from international cricket after the West Indies tour. The announcement came just after two days, where Test captain Misbah-ul-Haq also announced his retirement in the same tour. The critics cited the retirement of two Pakistani greats at the same time is as The End of an era, end of a subculture, revealing the Pakistan cricket will have to find new faces for their future successes. The stats revealed that what will Pakistan miss after their retirements as well.

"People are calling me and asking me not to make any announcement to leave but now is the time, A time comes in every player's life when he has to decide and I always tried my best to serve my country with my head high. No player always remains fit, the motivation never remains the same, so this is the time when Younis should leave the field after the upcoming series in West Indies."

— Younis Khan.

However, in a conversation in Karachi, Younis opened his idea about the retirement, where he can extend his international career, but only if the Pakistan board and team needs him to do so. The news sudden many of the global fans, and some said he should retire with the dignity and some said he should extend the career for two more years. With that, on 23 April 2017, Younis confirmed his retirement at the end of West Indies tour with Misbah, by citing he will retire even if he scores "a hundred in every innings of every match against West Indies".

"A lot has been said about my retirement from cricket that maybe Younis wants to keep on playing Test cricket which is absolutely not true, I had announced my retirement with a plan, with honour after thinking and according to my wish"

— Younis Khan.

Younis played his last international match against West Indies on 10 May 2017 at Roseau. He scored 18 runs in the first innings and 35 runs in the second innings. However, Pakistan won the match by 101 runs and sealed the series 2–1. The retirement of Younis and Misbah at the same time gave big farwell to both of them and ESPNcricinfo quoted their retirement with #MisYou.

== Playing style ==
=== Batting ===
Younis was regarded as one of the best players of spin bowling in the world, being particularly strong on the leg side. His favourite and trademark shot is the flick, but it has also been his shortcoming, with him being particularly prone to falling lbw during the early stages of his innings. He is also prone to getting down on one knee and driving extravagantly. But this flamboyance is coupled with grit. One of his main weaknesses is playing away from the body, he also has a tendency to leave straight balls, a trait that has been exploited by bowlers in the past, particularly by the Australian attack. Along with Mohammad Yousuf and Inzamam-ul-Haq, he formed a formidable middle order batting line up for Pakistan.

=== Fielding ===
Younis was a skillful infielder, with a report prepared by ESPNcricinfo in late 2005 showing that since the 1999 Cricket World Cup, he had effected the third highest number of run-outs in ODI cricket (joint with Andrew Symonds), having the highest success rate with 20 run-outs in 118 matches (equivalent to 0.1694 run-outs per match), ahead of Jonty Rhodes (15 run-outs in 94 matches or 0.1595 run-outs per match.) Khan holds the record for most catches in all formats of the game combined for Pakistan, with 281 in 408 matches, well ahead of the second on the list, Inzamam-ul-Haq (194 catches in 495 matches), Younis having 0.558 catches per innings as a fielder.

== Post-retirement ==
=== Coaching career ===
On 11 May 2017, ACB announced that Younis Khan will be next coach of Afghanistan national cricket team. Later on, this offer was declined by Younis Khan.

In May 2019, Younis Khan was close to taking up a role as the Pakistan's Under-19 coach but both, PCB & Khan, failed to reach to an agreement. One of the sticking points had to do with finances, while the other was with the job profile, as the PCB had proposed Younis only be a mentor and a coach but he wanted a say in selection as well.

On 9 June 2020, the PCB appointed Younis Khan as their batting coach for Pakistan's tour to England. His contract as batting coach extended in November 2020 till T-20 Cricket World Cup 2022. However, in June 2021, he and PCB part ways only six months after he accepted a two-year contract. It was reported Younis had an argument with Pakistani bowler Hassan Ali. Later, Younis confirmed the spat by stating "Hassan Ali apologised to me, and I had forgiven him."

On 2 April 2022, Younis Khan was named as the batting consultant of Afghanistan on a temporary contract for a training camp which lasted 15 days in the UAE.

== Legacy and achievements ==
- First Pakistani to score 10,000+ runs in Test cricket.
- Younis became the third Pakistani to reach 8,500 runs in Test cricket on 6 May 2015. He was the 28th Test batsman overall to reach the milestone.
- His 34 centuries are the highest number of Test centuries by a Pakistani.
- The first Test batsman in history to score five centuries in the fourth innings.
- Younis and Misbah-ul-Haq hold the record for most runs as partners in Test cricket for Pakistan.
- He has 6 double centuries in Test matches.
- Younis became the third Pakistani to score a triple century in Test matches when he scored 313 with in 568 balls with 27 fours and 4 sixes against Sri Lanka in Karachi on 21 February 2009.
- Younis is the only Pakistani to score a Test hundred against every other 9 Test playing nations and 12th International player to achieve this milestone.
- The 5th fastest batsman to reach 7500 runs, achieving the feat in just 90 matches.
- Holds the record of most away centuries by a Pakistani (23), this is the second highest overall.
- He is the first (and the only) Pakistani cricketer to take 100 catches in Test matches.
- He has now 4000+ runs at number 3 in Test which is most by any Pakistan Cricketer with average in excess of 50's.
- Most number of centuries (14) after the age of 35 among Pakistani cricketers.
- Younis has scored three consecutive Test hundreds against Australia, a feat only shared by Herbert Sutcliffe, way back in 1924–25.
- Younis has involved in 63 hundred run partnerships in Tests cricket, the same as Kumar Sangakkara and 1 more than Brian Lara.

=== Awards ===
On 23 March 2010, Younis was awarded the Pride of Performance by President of Pakistan Asif Ali Zardari.

On 23 March 2018, he was awarded the Sitara-i-Imtiaz by President of Pakistan Mamnoon Hussain.

== International centuries ==
Younis Khan scored 34 Test centuries and 7 ODI centuries.

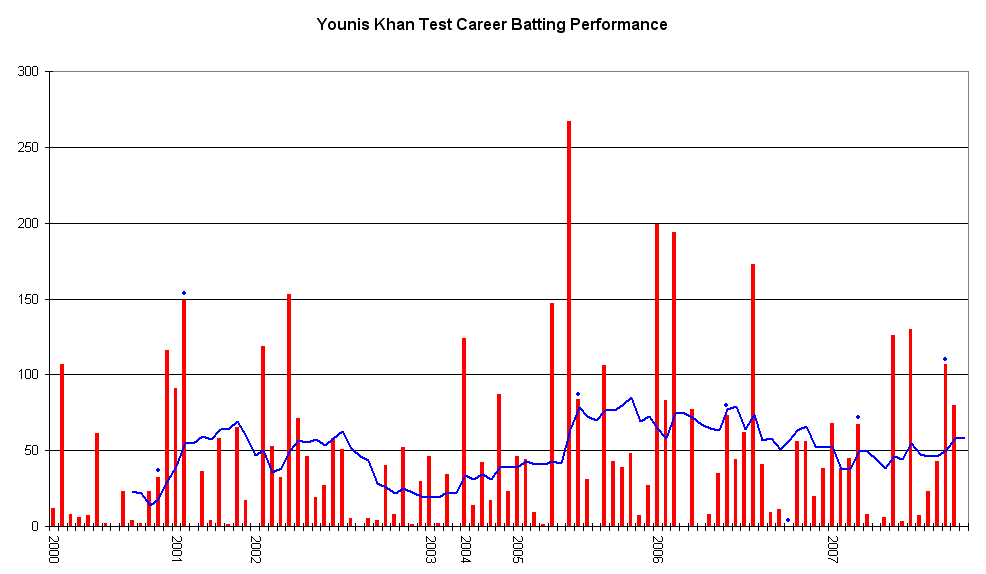
An innings-by-innings breakdown of Younis's Test match batting career, showing runs scored (red bars) and the average of the last ten innings (blue line).

== See also ==
- List of players who have scored 10,000 or more runs in Test cricket
- List of cricketers who have scored centuries in both innings of a Test match

Preceded by Shoaib Malik	Pakistani national cricket captain (ODI & Tests); 2009	Succeeded by Mohammad Yousuf
Preceded by Shoaib Malik	Pakistani national cricket captain (T20I); 2009	Succeeded by Shahid Afridi
