= 1996–97 Wills Cup =

The Wills Cup is the premiere domestic One Day cricket competition of Pakistan. During the 1996–97 season, in a bid to make the tournament more interesting, the organizers invited a team from Bangladesh to take part. With the Bangladesh national team preparing for the ICC Trophy in Malaysia, the Bangladesh 'A' side, led by Harunur Rashid took part in the competition. The tourists were eliminated in the 1st round after losing all four of their group games. in addition to their games in the Wills Cup, the tourists also took part in a number of practice games.

== Matches ==
22 February
Scorecard

United Bank Limited (Pakistan); 246/9 (50 overs)	v	Bangladesh Cricket Board XI; 146 (48.1 overs)
Mansoor Akhtar 77 (133); Mafizur Rahman 3/54 (10 overs)		Habibul Bashar 35* (73); Waqar Younis 5/32 (10 overs)

United Bank Limited won by 100 runs
National Stadium, Karachi
Umpires: Ghafoor Butt and Shakeel Khan
Player of the match: Waqar Younis (Pakistan)

- Bangladesh Cricket Board XI won the toss and elected to field.

26 February
Scorecard

National Bank of Pakistan; 246/9 (50 overs)	v	Bangladesh Cricket Board XI; 186 (48.2 overs)
Tahir Shah 77 (87); Saifullah Khan 2/32 (6 overs)		Habibul Bashar 71 (116); Mohammad Javed 4/24 (9.2 overs)

National Bank of Pakistan won by 8 wickets
National Stadium, Karachi
Umpires: Saleem Badar and Shakeel Khan
Player of the match: Tahir Shah (Pakistan)

- National Bank of Pakistan won the toss and elected to field.

28 February
Scorecard

Pakistan International Airlines; 267/6 (50 overs)	v	Bangladesh Cricket Board XI; 159/6 (50 overs)
Mahmood Hamid 72 (91); Zakir Hasan 2/24 (10 overs)		Habibul Bashar 42* (55); Saqlain Mushtaq 2/19 (10 overs)

Pakistan International Airlines won by 108 runs
National Stadium, Karachi
Umpires: Saleem Badar and Shakeel Khan
Player of the match: Mahmood Hamid (Pakistan)

- Bangladesh Cricket Board XI won the toss and elected to field.

2 March
Scorecard

Agriculture Development Bank of Pakistan; 214/2 (41.1 overs)	v	Bangladesh Cricket Board XI; 213/6 (50 overs)
Zahoor Elahi 133 (122); Salahuddin Ahmed 2/50 (10 overs)		Shahriar Hossain 76 (115); Mohammad Asif 4/44 (10 overs)

Agriculture Development Bank of Pakistan won by 8 wickets
National Stadium, Karachi
Umpires: Saleem Badar and Shakeel Khan
Player of the match: Zahoor Elahi (Pakistan)

- Agriculture Development Bank of Pakistan won the toss and elected to field.
