= 2014–15 National One Day Cup =

- Dates: 19 January – 1 February
- Administrator: Pakistan Cricket Board
- Cricket format: List A cricket
- Tournament format: Round Robin
- Host: Pakistan
- Champions: State Bank
- Participants: 12

The Haier Presents Gold One Day Cup 2014–15 is the thirty edition started in 1985–86 is the premier List A cricket domestic competition in Pakistan, which was held from 19 January 2015 to 1 February 2015.

== Venue ==
Venue of teams in 2015 National One Day Cup

== Fixtures and Results ==
All times shown are in Pakistan Standard Time (UTC+05).

=== Group stage ===
==== Group I ====
Points Table Source:Cricinfo

Team	Pld	W	L	NR	NRR	Pts
Karachi Dolphins	5	4	1	0	+1.251	8
NBP	5	3	2	0	+1.702	6
SNGPL	5	3	2	0	+0.440	6
Peshawar Panthers	5	2	3	0	–0.658	4
ZTBL	5	2	3	0	–1.309	4
Rawalpindi Rams	5	1	4	0	–1.889	2
