= England A cricket team in Bangladesh in 1999–2000 =

The England A cricket team toured Bangladesh in the 1999–2000 season and played five first-class matches including three matches against the Bangladesh national team.

The England A team was captained by Mark Alleyne and included well-known players like Marcus Trescothick, IanWard, James Kirtley, Vikram Solanki, Paul Franks and Alamgir Sheriyar.

The first and third matches against Bangladesh were drawn but England A won the second by 5 wickets.
