= Pentangular Trophy =

The Pentangular Trophy was a first-class cricket competition that was held intermittently in Pakistan between 1973–74 and 2011–12.

== History ==
The Pentangular Trophy was first contested in 1973–74. From 1977 to 1978 through to 1979–80 it was known as the BCCP Invitation Tournament. Between 1980–81 and 1986–87, with the exception of 1983–84 when it was not held, it was called the PACO Cup under the sponsorship of the Pakistan Automobile Corporation. After 1983–84, it was only held three times, in 1990–91, 1994–95 and 1995–96, until it was revived in 2005–06. In 2007–08 it became a five-team regional tournament and was then held every season until 2011–12, after which it again went into abeyance.

== Format ==
As the name suggests, the Pentangular Trophy was usually contested between five teams, although there were sometimes as many as ten, who played each other on a round-robin basis, with the winner being determined either by their standing on the points table or by means of a final. The participants were originally selected by the Board of Control for Cricket in Pakistan (BCCP) before qualification criteria were introduced. Commonly this was the top teams in the two leading first-class competitions played earlier in the season, the Quaid-e-Azam Trophy and the Patron's Trophy.

== Winners ==
Season	Team
Pentangular Trophy
1973–74	Pakistan International Airlines
1974–75	National Bank of Pakistan
1975–76	Pakistan International Airlines
BCCP Invitation Tournament
1977–78	Habib Bank
1978–79	Habib Bank + Pakistan International Airlines
1979–80	Pakistan International Airlines
Pakistan Automobile Corporation (PACO) Cup
1980–81	Pakistan International Airlines
1981–82	Habib Bank
1982–83	Habib Bank
Tournament not held in 1983–84
1984–85	United Bank Limited
1985–86	Pakistan Automobiles Corporation
1986–87	Pakistan International Airlines
Pentangular Trophy
Tournament not held between 1986–87 and 1990–91
1990–91	United Bank Limited
Tournament not held between 1990–91 and 1994–95
1994–95	National Bank of Pakistan
1995–96	United Bank Limited
Tournament not held between 1995–96 and 2005–06
Pentangular Cup
2005–06	National Bank of Pakistan
2006–07	Habib Bank
2007–08	Sindh
RBS Pentangular Cup
2008–09	North-West Frontier Province
2009–10	Sui Northern Gas Pipelines Limited
Pentangular Cup
2010–11	Sindh
2011–12	Punjab
