= New Crescent Society =

Leading UK based Islamic astronomy and moonsighting society

- Abbreviation: NCS
- Formation: 2016 (1437 AH)
- Type: Voluntary, non-profit organisation
- Purpose: Promotion and coordination of local (UK only ) naked eye crescent moon observations for the Islamic calendar
- Headquarters: London, United Kingdom
- Region served: United Kingdom (with partner observers in Europe & Africa)
- Key people: Imad Ahmed (Founder and Director); Christopher Downie, Akhlaaq Abdur-Razzaque and Mohammad Quraishi (National Coordinators)
- Website: newcrescentsociety.org

New Crescent Society (NCS) is a British grassroots astronomy network founded in 2016 by Imad Ahmed. The New Crescent Society is an organisation which celebrates the relationship between astronomy, faith and Islam, with a motto of 'connecting the community to the cosmos'. It has engaged in the British Islamic calendar debates to promote unity, by being the first group in the history of the British Muslims to build a nationwide network of naked-eye moonsighters who can observe and determine the start of each lunar month according to local lunar observations to manage the Islamic calendar within the British Isles. It promotes a "local-first" model where Muslims in Britain can establish the Islamic calendar by direct observation within the British Isles and completing 30 days when the moon is not seen, rather than following the calendar other countries. It is often referred to as the UK's leading Islamic Calendar.

== History ==
The New Crescent Society was founded by Imad Ahmed in 2016 as an amateur astronomy club interested in the relationship between astronomy and Islam. It began its relationship with the Royal Observatory Greenwich 2017, launching the successful 'Astronomy and Islam' programme - a series of educational Planetarium shows, educational events and astronomy livestreams. Ahmed has said that his interest in establishing a British moonsighting network developed partly from disagreements over the dates of Ramadan and Eid among Muslim communities in the United Kingdom.

A visit to Cape Town, South Africa, in 2015 was an important influence on the organisation's development. Ahmed encountered the city's tradition of Muslims gathering communally to observe the crescent Moon and subsequently sought to establish similar public observations in Britain. After returning to the UK, Ahmed enrolled on an astronomy course at the Royal Observatory Greenwich and established the New Crescent Society.

NCS subsequently developed regular monthly observations in locations around the country. In 2023, Hyphen reported that the Society had trained dozens of moon-sighters who participated in monthly events across the UK, while The New Arab reported that its continuous monthly observation data extended back to September 2017.

The organization's main activities were lunar observations, training events in the history of astronomy and Islam, learning about Islami prayer times, and discussing the history of the Islamic calendar debates in the UK. During the COVID-19 lockdown in 2020, observers kept up socially distanced photographic logs for a full year of continuous data. Testimonies via Zoom was also introduced around this time, something which is still streamed live to this day. By 2025, the Society marked its eighth year with over 100 monthly sighting attempts recorded, the integration of Met Office forecasts into its planning, and the documentation of one of the youngest ever crescents seen in the UK.

In August 2026, the Society announced a week-long programme of Islam and astronomy activities in Cape Town, South Africa, scheduled for 9–16 August, including a public Rabi al-Awwal crescent observation.

== Moonsighters Academy ==
In 2025, the New Crescent Society joined the University of Cambridge and the University of Leeds in establishing the Moonsighters Academy, a nine-month programme combining astronomy education, online and in-person training, and practical lunar observations. The programme was funded through a Spark Award from the Science and Technology Facilities Council, part of UK Research and Innovation, and was intended to train community leaders to establish local astronomy and lunar-observation activities in their own communities.

The programme began with residential training at the University of Leeds in January 2026 before continuing through online sessions, practical observations and peer support. With a final meeting at the University of Cambridge and Cambridge central Mosque in June 2026 The academy's cohort consisted of 38 participants from across the UK, with an equal number of men and women, and included imams, Scout leaders and other community organisers.

== Activities and partnerships ==
The New Crescent Society has helped dozens of UK mosques align their calendars with local sightings, and its work has been featured by BBC News, BBC One Show, New Scientist, and Al Jazeera for its "citizen-science Islam" approach. The group has also co-hosted the "Moon & Faith" exhibition at the Royal Greenwich Observatory alongside yearly Ramadan sightings. It also works closely with Cambridge University. The society had also provided expert advice on the size, angle and timing of the crescent moon to the Mayor of London assembly in assisting with its "London Eye Eid light up.". The UK Royal charter affiliated The Scout Association also worked with the society to make sighting the crescent moon one of its child friendly outdoor activities.

The Society has developed a longstanding relationship with the Royal Observatory Greenwich through public astronomy events and moonsighting programmes. On 18 February 2026, the Royal Observatory and NCS jointly broadcast a live search for the Ramadan crescent from Greenwich, presented by Royal Observatory astronomer Jake Foster and NCS director Imad Ahmed. NCS observers joined the broadcast from locations around the country, with the organisation reporting a confirmed sighting from Jersey shortly after the livestream ended.

The National Maritime Museum's 2025–26 annual report described the collaboration with NCS as an established partnership. It reported that the 2026 Ramadan broadcast received 14,800 YouTube views on the day, later increasing to 32,200, with a further 46,977 views through the Royal Museums Greenwich website.

NCS has also participated in public astronomy and educational activities at venues including the Natural History Museum, Trafalgar Square and Stonehenge.

== 1447 Islamic calendar dates (UK) ==
The table below gives the Islamic months for 1447 AH in the United Kingdom according to the New Crescent Society's (NCS) local naked-eye moonsighting criteria. Dates are projected from crescent visibility data published by the HM Nautical Almanac Office who work directly with NCS to provide predictions that can be used by Government Departments, Islamic Intuitions and schools/employers.

UK Islamic calendar – 1447 AH (NCS)
Islamic month	Start date (UK)	Length (days)	Status
Muharram	27 June 2025	30	Confirmed
Safar	27 July 2025	30	Confirmed
Rabi al-Awwal	26 August 2025	30	Confirmed
Rabi al-Thani	25 September 2025	30	Confirmed
Jumada al-Ula	25 October 2025	30	Confirmed
Jumada al-Akhira	24 November 2025	29	Confirmed
Rajab	23 December 2025	29	Confirmed
Sha'ban	21 January 2026	29	Confirmed
Ramadan	19 February 2026	30	Confirmed
Shawwal	21 March 2026	29	Confirmed
Dhu'l-Qa'dah	19 April 2026	29	Confirmed
Dhu'l-Hijjah	18 May 2026	30	Confirmed

=== Key Islamic observances in 1447 AH (UK) ===
Key Islamic Dates for 1447 AH (UK)
Observance	Islamic date (1447 AH)	UK date (2025–2026)	Notes
Islamic New Year	1 Muharram	27 June 2025 (Confirmed)	Marks the beginning of the lunar year.
Day of ʿĀshūrāʾ	10 Muharram	6 July 2025 (Confirmed)	Day of fasting and remembrance of Musa and the martyrdom of Imam Hussayn.
Mawlid al-Nabi	12 Rabi al-Awwal	7 September 2025 (Predicted)	Celebrated by some as the birthday of Muhammad. Not celebrated by Orthodox Sunni communities
Start of Ramadan	1 Ramadan	19 February 2026 (Predicted)	Beginning of the month of fasting.
Laylat al-Qadr	(Night Of) 27 Ramadan	16–17 March 2026 (Predicted)	The Night of Power; considered the most blessed night of the year.
Eid al-Fitr	1 Shawwāl	21 March 2026 (Predicted)	Feast marking the end of Ramadan.
Day of Arafah	9 Dhu'l-Hijjah	26 May 2026 (Predicted)	Day before Eid al-Adha; recommended for fasting.
Eid al-Adha	10 Dhu'l-Hijjah	27 May 2026 (Predicted)	Feast of Sacrifice.

== 1448 Islamic calendar dates (UK) ==
The table below gives the Islamic months for 1448 AH in the United Kingdom according to the New Crescent Society's (NCS) local naked-eye moonsighting criteria. Dates are projected from crescent visibility data published by the HM Nautical Almanac Office who work directly with NCS to provide predictions that can be used by Government Departments, Islamic Institutions and schools/employers.

UK Islamic calendar – 1448 AH (NCS)
Islamic month	Start date (UK)	Length (days)	Status
Muharram	17 June 2026	29	Confirmed
Safar	16 July 2026	30	Confirmed
Rabi al-Awwal	15 August 2026	30	Confirmed
Rabi al-Thani	14 September 2026	30	Confirmed
Jumada al-Ula	14 October 2026	29	Confirmed
Jumada al-Akhira	13 November 2026	29	Confirmed
Rajab	12 December 2026	29	Predicted
Sha'ban	10 January 2027	29	Predicted
Ramadan	8 February 2027	30	Predicted
Shawwal	10 March 2027	29	Predicted
Dhu'l-Qa'dah	8 April 2027	30	Predicted
Dhu'l-Hijjah	8 May 2027	29	Predicted

=== Key Islamic observances in 1448 AH (UK) ===
Key Islamic Dates for 1448 AH (UK)
Observance	Islamic date (1448 AH)	UK date (2026–2027)	Notes
Islamic New Year	1 Muharram	17 June 2026 (Predicted)	Marks the beginning of the lunar year.
Day of ʿĀshūrāʾ	10 Muharram	26 June 2026 (Predicted)	Day of fasting and remembrance of Musa and the martyrdom of Imam Hussayn.
Mawlid al-Nabi	12 Rabi al-Awwal	26 August 2026 (Predicted)	Celebrated by some as the birthday of Muhammad. Not celebrated by Orthodox Sunni communities.
Start of Ramadan	1 Ramadan	8 February 2027 (Predicted)	Beginning of the month of fasting.
Laylat al-Qadr	(Night Of) 27 Ramadan	5–6 March 2027 (Predicted)	The Night of Power; considered the most blessed night of the year.
Eid al-Fitr	1 Shawwāl	10 March 2027 (Predicted)	Feast marking the end of Ramadan.
Day of Arafah	9 Dhu'l-Hijjah	16 May 2027 (Predicted)	Day before Eid al-Adha; recommended for fasting.
Eid al-Adha	10 Dhu'l-Hijjah	17 May 2027 (Predicted)	Feast of Sacrifice.

== Criticism and debate ==
Some scholars believe that following moon sightings from countries like Morocco or Saudi Arabia helps maintain global unity among Muslims. On the other hand, some astronomers say the New Crescent Society is too cautious for not accepting sightings detected only by CCD equipment. The Society's view is that traditional Islamic rulings prioritise either direct sighting of the crescent or completing thirty days, and while optical tools can help locate the moon, they insist that a naked-eye sighting is still required which aligns with the mainstream Sunni Islamic View.

== Objectives ==
The New Crescent Society is an organisation which celebrates the relationship between astronomy, faith and Islam. It hopes to bring unity amongst the Muslim community in the UK about the calendar debates by forging a path based on a position which is closest to the sunnah, and is acceptable by all: local naked eye moon sighting, as was traditionally done. It trains volunteers, keeps a record of sightings, and shares clear calendars so communities can start Ramadan and Eid together. The group also creates simple guides to help people learn about the Islamic lunar calendar.
