= Ramadan in the United Arab Emirates =

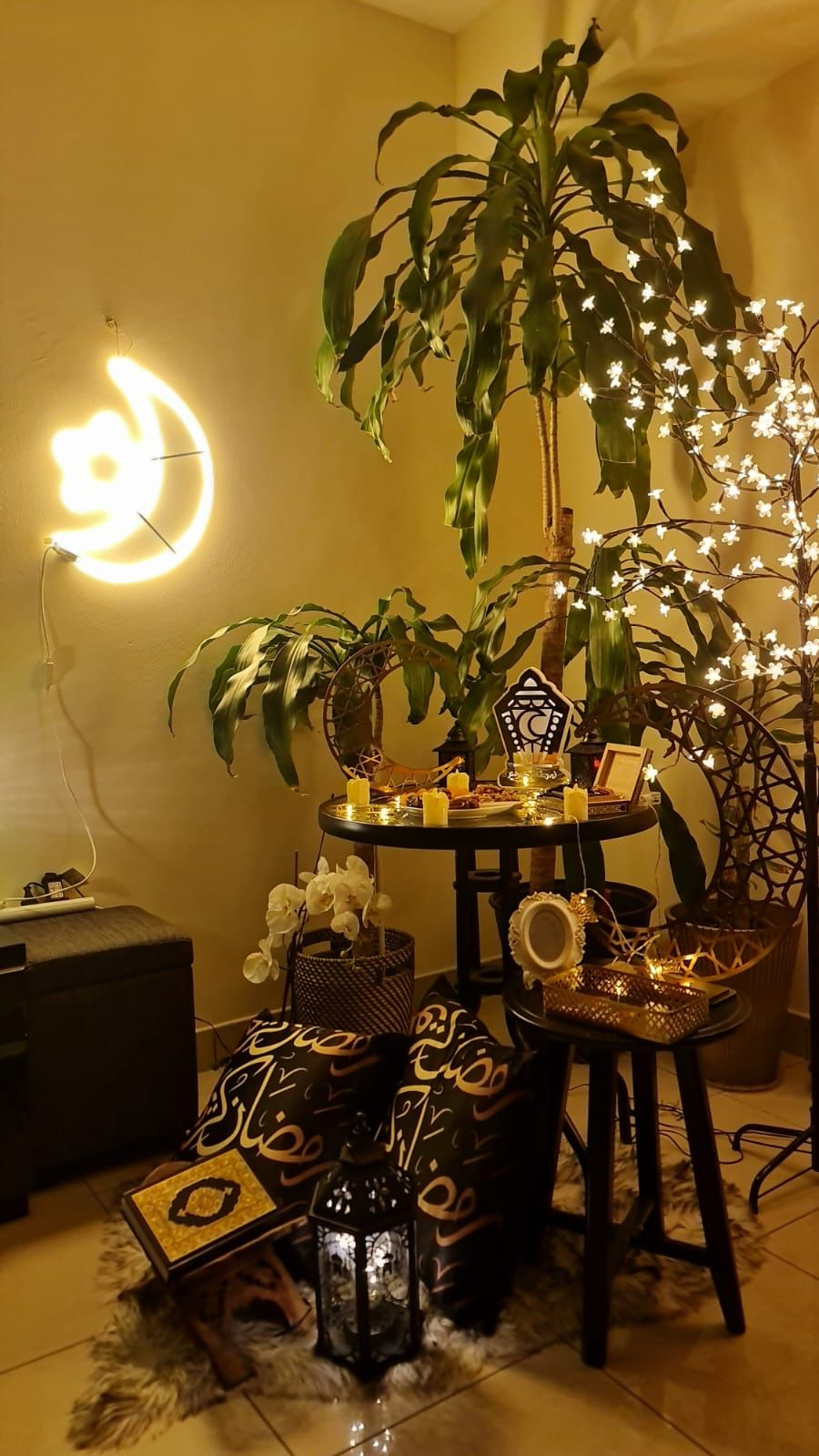
A home decorated for Ramadan

Ramadan in the United Arab Emirates has distinctive customs, traditions and rituals. Ramadan is the ninth month of the Islamic calendar, observed by Muslims as a month of fasting, prayer, reflection, and community. Celebrations and preparations for Ramadan begin on the night of the middle of Sha'ban, known as "Haq al-Laila" (Arabic: حق الليلة) in the UAE. The month is filled with entertainment, spiritual, and cultural activities and events that tie into the atmosphere of Ramadan.

== Haq al-Laila ==
The celebration of the month of Ramadan begins in the UAE on the night of the middle of Sha'ban, known locally as "Haq Al-Laila" or "Qarqe’an". Haq al-Laila represents love and giving. The Emirati tradition involves girls dressed in embroidered clothes and boys in thawb, gathering from afternoon to sunset, carrying bags made of cloth called "Al-Kharayet". They chant traditional songs and go around the neighborhood asking for sweets and nuts.

== Ramadan crescent ==
In the past, as the month of Ramadan approached, a group of men would meet every day after the Maghrib prayer to search for the crescent moon. Among them were trusted men who had memorized the Quran and were well known for their accurate sighting of the crescent. When the sighting was confirmed, the news was announced by firing the cannon and everyone exchanged congratulations. Nowadays, Emiratis and residents rely on the official Emirati media about the investigation of the International Astronomy Center for the Crescent from the summit of Jebel Jais, the UAE's highest peak.

== Ramadan cannon ==
The tradition of Ramadan cannon has been inherited in the Emirates for 40 years. its people and residents used to watch it during the month of Ramadan, at the end of fasting hours and coinciding with call to Maghrib prayer. The locations of the iftar cannon vary, but the site must be one of the most famous tourist attractions in the emirate.

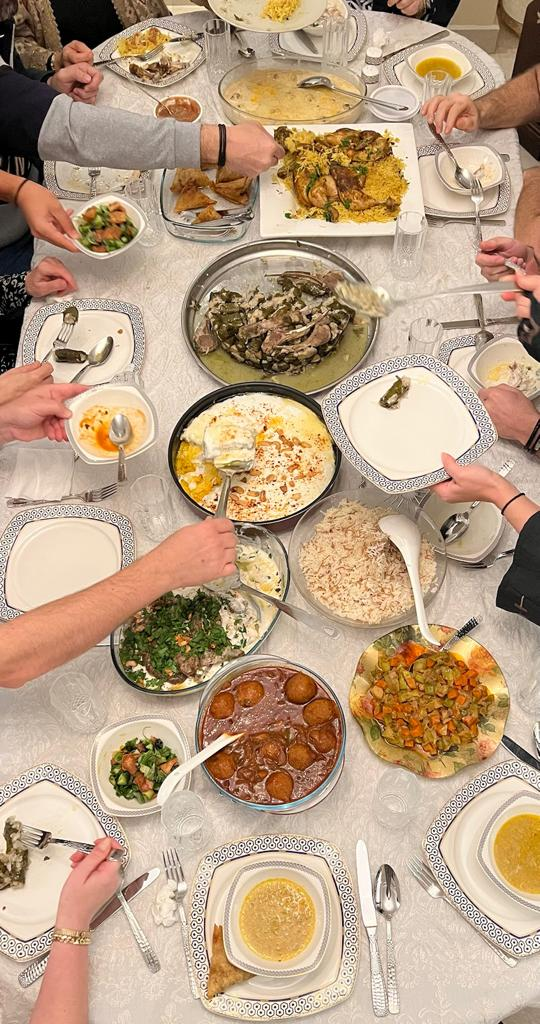
Iftar family gathering.

== Food ==
Despite the changes and developments that have taken place in various aspects of life in the Emirates, many families still adhere to the customs of the Ramadan feast. As the sun approaches sunset, family members gather around the table, waiting for the call to Maghrib prayer to break their fast. The first thing that Emirati families prefer to eat after dates and milk is the popular traditional dish, harees, which is considered a main dish on the Emirati table during the month of Ramadan.

Rice, fish, and meat are among the main meals in the UAE, and the most popular dishes on Ramadan tables include harees, thareed, biryani, machboos, luqaimat, and Ferni dessert.

Drinks particularly popular during iftar meals in the UAE include Arabic coffee (usually served with dates), Karak tea, jallab, Qamar al-Din, ayran, and vimto.

== Entertainment ==
Dubai illuminates the city during Ramadan with numerous lights and decorations, including the "Modhish" character displayed on lampposts and trees. Popular market centers are adorned with traditional Ramadan decorations. The Dubai Festival City Mall's night market offers Arabic musical entertainment sessions and a unique camel ride experience. The Emirati Village hosts workshops, storytelling for children, and displays of Emirati heritage equipment and Arabic calligraphy arts to showcase the traditions of the Emirati people.

== Religious rituals ==
=== Iftar Projects and Mercy Tables ===
The UAE government organizes the Iftar Projects and Mercy Tables to bring together Muslims of different nationalities, cultures, and social backgrounds around a shared iftar table.

Mercy tables are set up voluntarily by authorized individuals, who create open seating areas or tents in front of mosques or in open spaces across the country. The Red Crescent Society of the United Arab Emirates also organizes Ramadan tents.

In Abu Dhabi, the "Our Fasting Guests" project is held annually at the Sheikh Zayed Mosque. This initiative offers breakfast meals to fasting individuals in collaboration with the Armed Forces Officers Club in Abu Dhabi. The project benefits tens of thousands of people who are fasting every day, as it provides around 12 large, air-conditioned tents to accommodate them throughout the month of Ramadan.

=== Quran recitation ===
Taraweh Prayer

In Dubai, the Islamic Affairs and Charitable Activities Department hosts Quran recitation events in mosques with lectures, religious lessons, Quran readings, and Quran memorization contests such as the Dubai International Holy Quran Award.

=== Taraweeh prayers ===
Taraweeh prayers are a key nightly ritual for Muslims, encouraged for both men and women. In the UAE, authorities set the schedule for daily prayers, including Taraweeh. Families come together to pray in mosques, where the number of prayer units may differ based on different Islamic scholars' views.

=== Visiting families ===
Emirati society places great importance on adhering to customs and traditions during Ramadan, with the "Majlis" being prepared for family and neighbors to receive visitors. In some cases, gifts are presented to families, Quran readers, and friends, as a way to strengthen kinship relationships.

=== Zakat Fund ===
The Zakat Fund is an independent institution in the UAE that is legally authorized to take actions to achieve its objectives. It operates to increase awareness of the importance of zakat and alms, especially during the month of Ramadan, and their vital role in community development. The Fund also supports needy families through various projects.

== Legal restrictions ==
Under the UAE labour law, working hours must not exceed eight hours per day. During Ramadan, this limit is reduced by two hours per day. This restriction applies to all employees irrespective of their faith. In the Dubai International Financial Centre, restrictions only apply to Muslims. In the Abu Dhabi Global Market they only apply to Muslim employees who observe the fast.

According to article 313 of the Federal Penal Code, consuming food or drink during Ramadan is forbidden, irrespective of faith. However, each Emirate can apply its own local criminal laws, as long as they are not inconsistent with the Federal Criminal Code. In several emirates, restaurants used to be closed during Ramadan but restrictions have been relaxed. For instance, in Dubai, screens and curtains used to be required to serve food out of public view. Since 2021, restaurants, cafes and bars can remain open and serve food publicly. In Abu Dhabi restaurants also remain open. In Sharjah, restaurants must obtain a permit to operate during daytime during Ramadan.
