= Ramadan in Turkey =

Religious observance in Turkey

Turkey celebrates the holy month of Ramadan with a spirit of celebration and social cohesion. Ramadan in Turkey is considered an important and distinctive period, as Muslims adhere to the daytime fast and participate in many religious and social activities and traditions. Muslims in Turkey call the month of Ramadan the “Sultan of the Months.”

== Ramadan traditions in Turkey ==
=== Sahoor and Iftar with the Adhan ===
Sahoor and Iftar with Adhan is a popular tradition in Turkey. Muslims wake up at sahoor to eat a light meal before the dawn prayer, and at iftar they gather to prepare and eat iftar and break the fast together with dates or olives and, then begin the main course.

=== Common dinner in mosques ===
Muslims in Turkey organize communal dinners in mosques during Ramadan. Turkey is famous for decorating minarets during the holy month of Ramadan, as they gather to eat and drink after the Maghrib prayer. A variety of meals are offered to the participants in the shared dinner, and this enhances the spirit of community and bonding among individuals.

=== Holy Quran competitions ===
Quran memorization and recitation competitions are held in Turkey during Ramadan. Children and adults participate in these to demonstrate their skills in reciting the Quran, and prizes are awarded to the winners.

=== Ramadan charity banquets ===
Offering charitable Ramadan banquets is an important part of Ramadan traditions in Turkey. Charitable institutions and organizations organize group iftar meals where food is distributed to the needy.

=== Social visits ===
Ramadan in Turkey witnesses social visits between family, friends, and neighbors. Greetings are exchanged, gifts are given, and social gatherings and special banquets are held twhich foster a spirit of intimacy and love in this blessed month.

== Foods in Ramadan ==
Ramadan in Turkey is also famous for the foods that characterize this holy month. Among thefoods consumed during the month of Ramadan are: [1]

- Ishli Kebab: pieces of meat grilled over charcoal and served with grilled onions and bread.
- Etli Kofte: spiced minced beef pieces shaped into long fingers, then fried or grilled. Usually served with rice and salads.
- Borek: filo pastry filled with minced meat, spinach or cheese, then fried .
- Lahmacun: fried dough dipped in sugar syrup, then decorated with nuts .
- Lentil soup: Lentil soup is considered one of the main dishes for Ramadan breakfast.
- Qatayef : A Turkish dessert, prepared especially during Ramadan. It consists of thin strips of pastry stuffed with walnuts or pistachios and sweetened with sugar syrup.

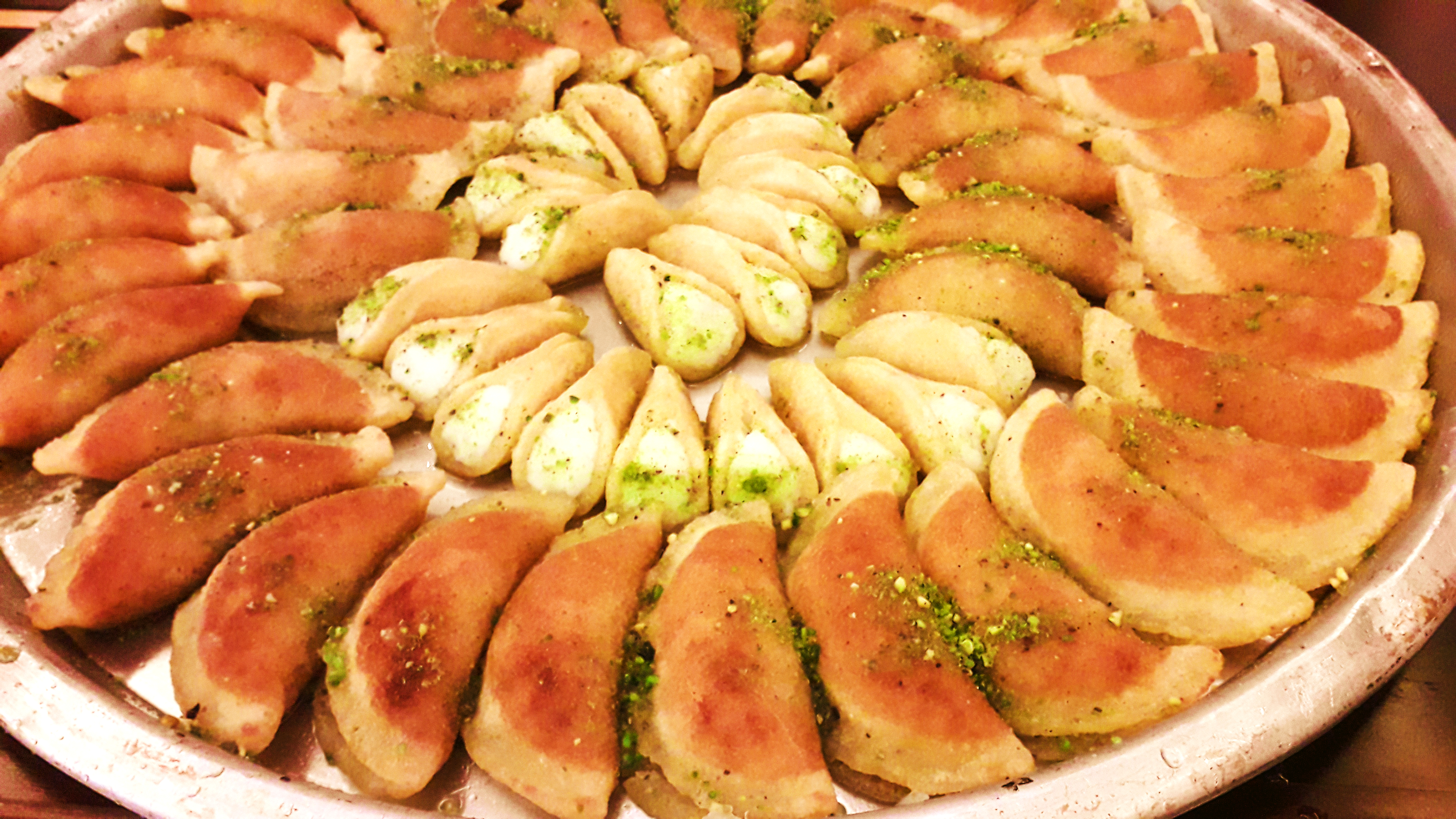
Picture of Qatayef, a popular Ramadan dessert filled with walnuts, cheese, or cream.

== See also ==
- Ramadan in Pakistan
- Ramadan in India
- Ramadan in Russia
