= United Bank Limited cricket team =

Cricket team

United Bank Limited

Personnel
- Owner: United Bank Limited

Team information
- Colours
- Founded: 1975
- Dissolved: 2018
- Home ground: United Bank Limited Sports Complex

History
- Quaid-e-Azam Trophy wins: 4
- Patron's Trophy wins: 1
- Pentangular Trophy wins: 3
- National One Day Cup wins: 1

United Bank Limited cricket team was a Pakistani domestic cricket team sponsored by United Bank Limited. The team was founded in 1975, and competed in various domestic competitions as a departmental team, principally in first-class cricket, winning nine championship trophies. Home matches were played at the United Bank Limited Sports Complex in Karachi.

UBL withdrew from domestic cricket in Pakistan in 1997 before returning in 2006, and regaining a place in first-class competition in 2011. In July 2018, United Bank Limited disbanded the team and pulled out of domestic circuit, with captain Younis Khan resigning, seemingly angered and hurt over failing to dissuade the bank against disbanding the team.

== Honours ==
=== First-class cricket ===
- Quaid-e-Azam Trophy (4)
  - 1976–77
  - 1980–81
  - 1982–83
  - 1984–85
- Patron's Trophy (1)
  - 1996–97
- Pentangular Trophy (3)
  - 1983–84
  - 1990–91
  - 1995–96

=== List A cricket ===
- National One Day Championship (1)
  - 2017–18

=== Others ===
- Patron's Trophy Grade-II (1)
  - 2010–11
- National One Day Championship Division Two (1)
  - 2011–12
