= Habib Bank Limited cricket team =

Cricket team

Habib Bank Limited
Personnel
- Captain: Shahid Afridi
- Coach: Kabir Khan
- Owner: Habib Bank Limited

Team information
- Colours: Green
- Founded: 1975
- Dissolved: 2019

The Habib Bank Limited cricket team was a first-class cricket side, sponsored by the Habib Bank Limited, who competed as a departmental team in Pakistan domestic cricket from 1975 to 1976 season.

Before disbandment, the bank was providing an annual budget of Rs. 100 million.

== History ==
Habib Bank made its debut on the Pakistan domestic circuit in 1975-76 and attained 'Grand Slam' in 1977–78.

Since their debut, they have won the United Bank Limited (UBL) Trophy and Servis Cup limited-overs competitions in their inaugural season.

As of mid-January 2014 they had played 378 first-class matches, with 166 wins, 70 losses, 141 draws and 1 tie. They had also played 257 List A matches, with 181 wins, 73 losses and 3 no-results, and 10 Twenty20 matches with 8 wins, 2 losses.

In April 2019, Habib Bank Limited did not renew their players' contracts and ended the team.

In May 2019, Pakistan's Prime Minister Imran Khan revamped the domestic cricket structure in Pakistan, excluding departmental teams in favour of regional sides, therefore ending the participation of the team. The Pakistan Cricket Board (PCB) was criticised in removing departmental sides, with players voicing their concern to revive the teams.

== Honours ==
Patron's Trophy (9)

- 1976–77
- 1977–78
- 1987–88
- 1991–92
- 1992–93
- 1997–98
- 1998–99
- 2004–05
- 2006–07

Pentangular Trophy (5)

- 1977–78
- 1978–79
- 1981–82
- 1982–83
- 2006–07

Quaid-e-Azam Trophy (3)

- 1977–78
- 2010–11
- 2018–19

National One Day Championship (6)

- 1986–87
- 1989–90
- 1990–91
- 1991–92
- 1993–94
- 2010–11

2018–19 Quaid-e-Azam One Day Cup (1)

- 2018–19

Ramadan T20 Cup (1)

- 2013
