= Ramadan in Pakistan =

Religious observance in Pakistan

Ramadan in Pakistan is an annual period of fasting, just like other Muslim countries, prayer, social solidarity, and cultural vibrancy observed by the Muslim population of Pakistan. This month-long observance interweaves religious rituals, unique local traditions, and socio-economic dynamics. Alongside its spiritual significance, Ramadan in Pakistan has profound cultural, economic, and media dimensions that reflect the country’s diverse heritage.

== Moon sighting controversies ==
In Pakistan, the beginning of Ramadan is determined by the sighting of the crescent moon (hilal) by the Ruet-e-Hilal Committee, the official moon-sighting authority. However, disagreements often arise between this committee and independent testimonies, leading to occasional discrepancies with neighboring countries like Afghanistan and India.

Sometimes, Pakistan starts Ramadan a day later than Gulf countries due to differing moon sightings. Eid Chand Raat (night of Eid moon sighting) also faces disputes, with some regions celebrating Eid a day apart due to local sightings.

== Cuisine and Iftar ==
Ramadan cuisine in Pakistan is a vibrant reflection of the country's diverse culinary heritage. The Iftar meal, which breaks the daily fast, is a cherished tradition that brings families and communities together. It typically begins with dates and water, followed by an array of savory and sweet dishes. Popular items include pakoras, samosas, chana chaat, and fruit salads, which are staples across households.

Regional specialties also play a significant role in Ramadan feasts. In urban centers like Karachi and Lahore, dishes such as mutton pulao and chicken karahi are widely enjoyed, while in northern areas, kabuli pulao—an Afghan-inspired rice dish—is a favorite. Desserts like seviyan (sweet vermicelli) and sooji ka halwa add a touch of sweetness to the celebrations.

The culinary traditions extend beyond homes to street vendors and restaurants, which offer Ramadan-specific menus and deals. Television cooking shows and food blogs further enrich the experience by showcasing recipes and tips for preparing festive meals.

== Law enforcement and security measures ==
As festive activities increase, especially on the eve of Eid (Chand Raat), law enforcement agencies heighten their vigilance. Special measures—such as increased police patrolling, the deployment of drone cameras and night vision equipment, and the setup of checkpoints—aim to ensure public safety amid large gatherings and heavy traffic. In some instances, police have conducted raids to confiscate unauthorized fireworks or curb unlawful activities that accompany large-scale celebrations.

== Media and entertainment ==
Ramadan has inspired a diverse range of iftar and sehri television programming and live events in Pakistan. Ramadan-special talk shows, religious transmissions, and cooking programs are integral parts of the month’s media landscape. In addition, television game shows—such as the acclaimed Jeeto Pakistan League, are entertaining while occasionally courting controversy for inappropriate content. The Ramadan T20 Cup, a cricket tournament held in Karachi in 2013.

== Economic impact ==
Unlike other countries, the month of Ramadan has a clear economic dimension in Pakistan. Increased demand for food, clothing, and festive goods typically contributes to noticeable price hikes in everyday commodities such as sugar, eggs, cooking oil, and fresh produce. Reports have noted that despite government oversight, price inflation remains a recurring issue during this period. This economic pressure has led to discussions on market ethics and governmental intervention, highlighting the tension between commercial activities and the Islamic principles of fairness and moderation.
