= Ramadan in India =

Islamic observance in India

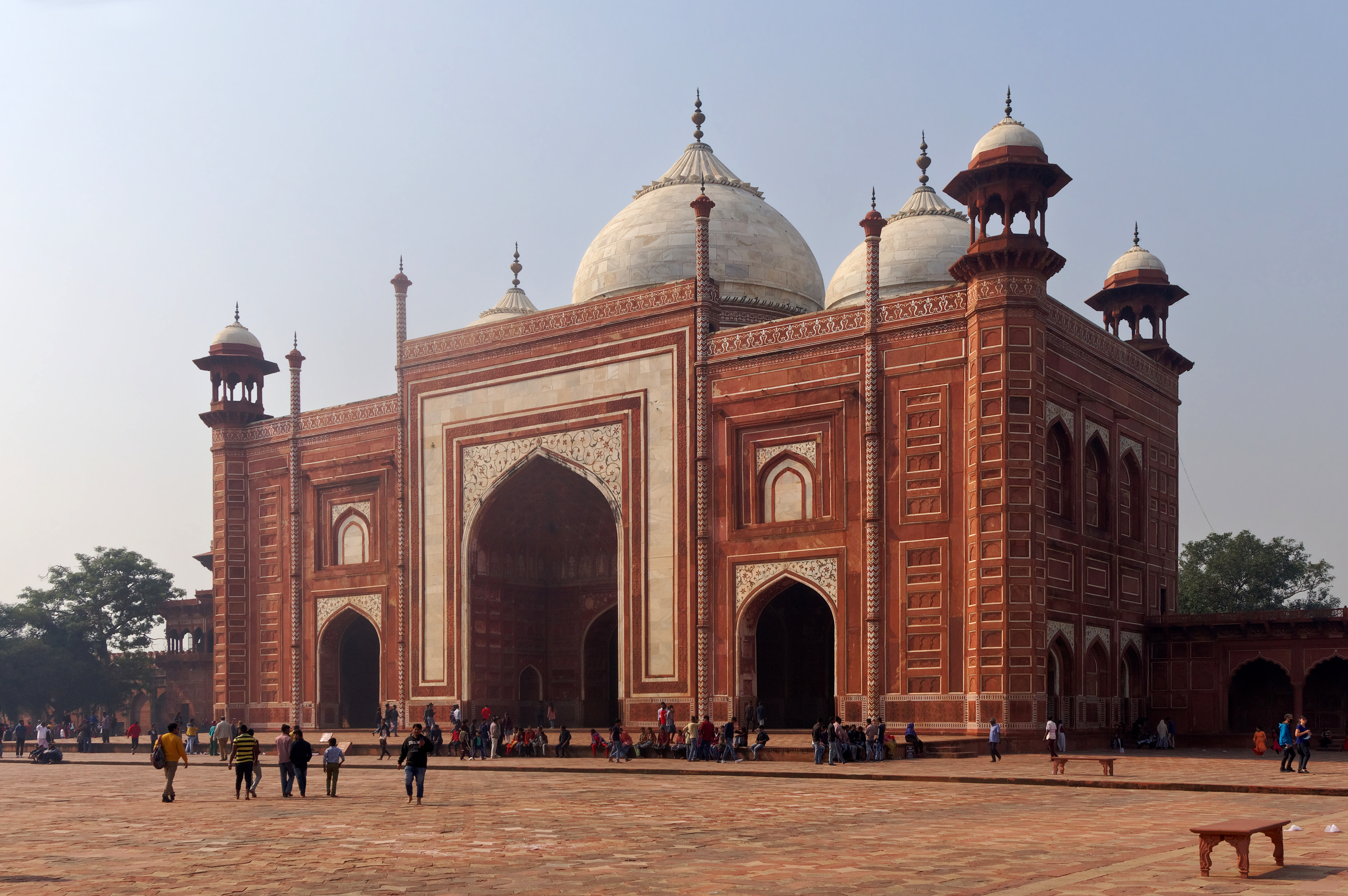
The Taj Mahal Mosque in Agra, India.

Ramadan (also Ramdan, or Ramazan/Ramzan) is observed with diverse traditions and customs in India. India has one of the largest Muslim populations in the world, with diverse Muslim groups present throughout the country.

== History ==
The roots of Islam in India date back to medieval times, when Muslims first arrived in India. Since then, Muslim communities in India have grown and developed their own Ramadan traditions.

== Food ==
A variety of foods and sweets are eaten during the iftar and suhur meals. Some notable foods include:

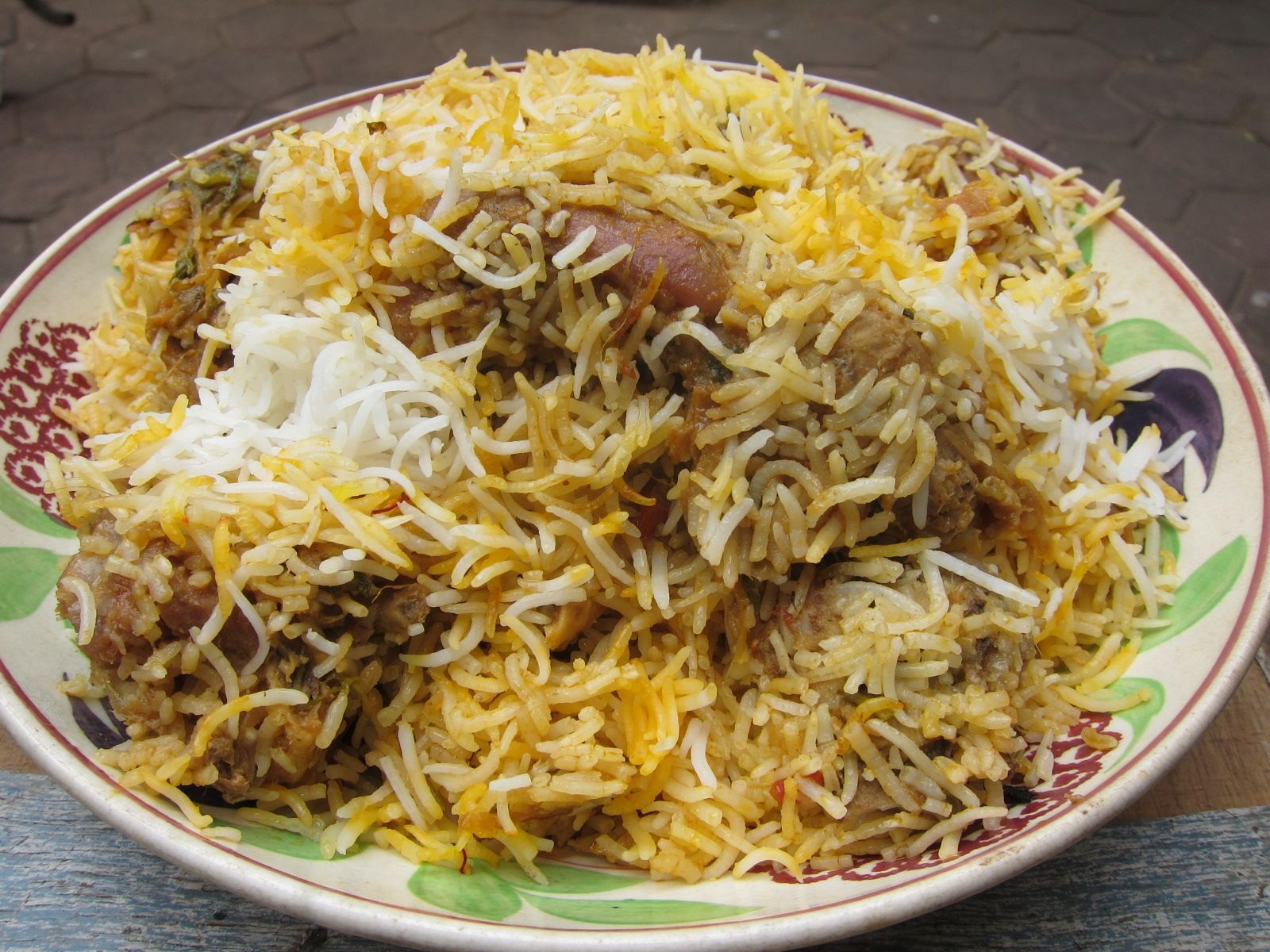
Biryani, an Indian rice dish

- Biryani
- Kebab
- Samosa
- Gulab jamun
- Phirni: a traditional Ramadan dessert. It consists of a mixture of milk, semolina, sugar, and nuts, which is served cold and garnished with saffron.
- Lassi
- Saffron cake
- Lachcha
- Sevai
- Maqooti, traditional food of Bihari Muslims

== Visits and social exchanges ==
During Ramadan, mutual visits occur between families, neighbors and close friends of different religions. Greetings are exchanged, gifts are given, and many special banquets and social feasts are held.

== Festivals and cultural heritage ==
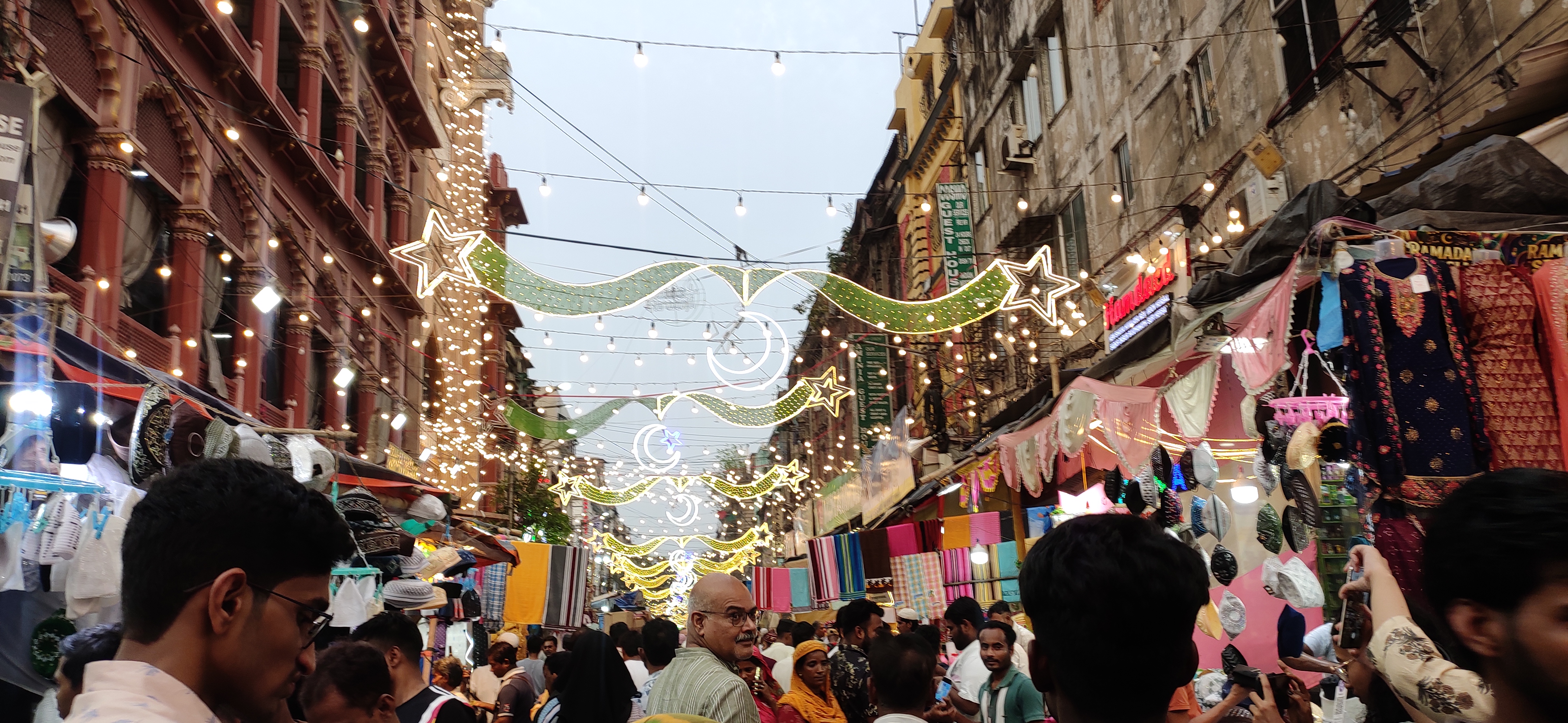
Ramadan decorations at Zakaria Street, Kolkata

Indian cities celebrate Ramadan festivals that are colorful, full of activities and celebrations. For example, in Hyderabad, the famous Ramadan market, Sharman Ramdan Street, is held, where a variety of foods and sweets are sold. In Delhi, the "Fez Ka Jashn" festival is held, which include artistic performances and the presence of the "musaharati", the person who calls people to wake up before the dawn call to prayer and eat the suhur meal to prepare for fasting.

== See also ==
- Ramadan in Afghanistan
- Ramadan in the Maldives
- Ramadan in Pakistan
- Ramadan bazaar
- Ramadan tent
- Fasting during Ramadan
- Iftar party
- Chaand Raat
- Date palm farming in India
