= Malam Tujuh Likur =

Malaysian and Indonesian traditions on the final week of Ramadan

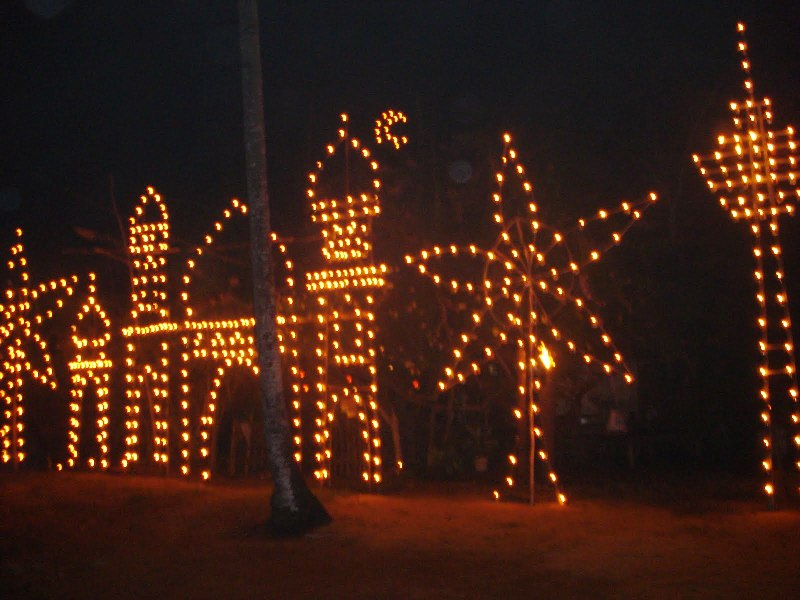
Pelita panjut, bamboo oil lamps of various structures, in Tepoh, Terengganu

Malam Tujuh Likur (lit. '27th night', Jawi: مالم توجوه ليكور), also known as Pitu Likur, likuran or malam selikur is a Malay tradition of lighting up traditional oil lamps known as pelita, commonly found in Malaysia and Indonesia. This activity is done on the 21st night of Ramadan, commencing the start of the final ten days of the month. The lamp will keep on added until reach it peak on 27 Ramadan. The activity is related to the Lailatul Qadar night which is supposedly happen on the last third of Ramadan.

== Etymology ==
"Likur" is a term derived from Javanese used to denote numerals of the range between 20 and 30, with the exception of 25 (Ngoko: salawe, Krama: salangkung).

== Tradition ==
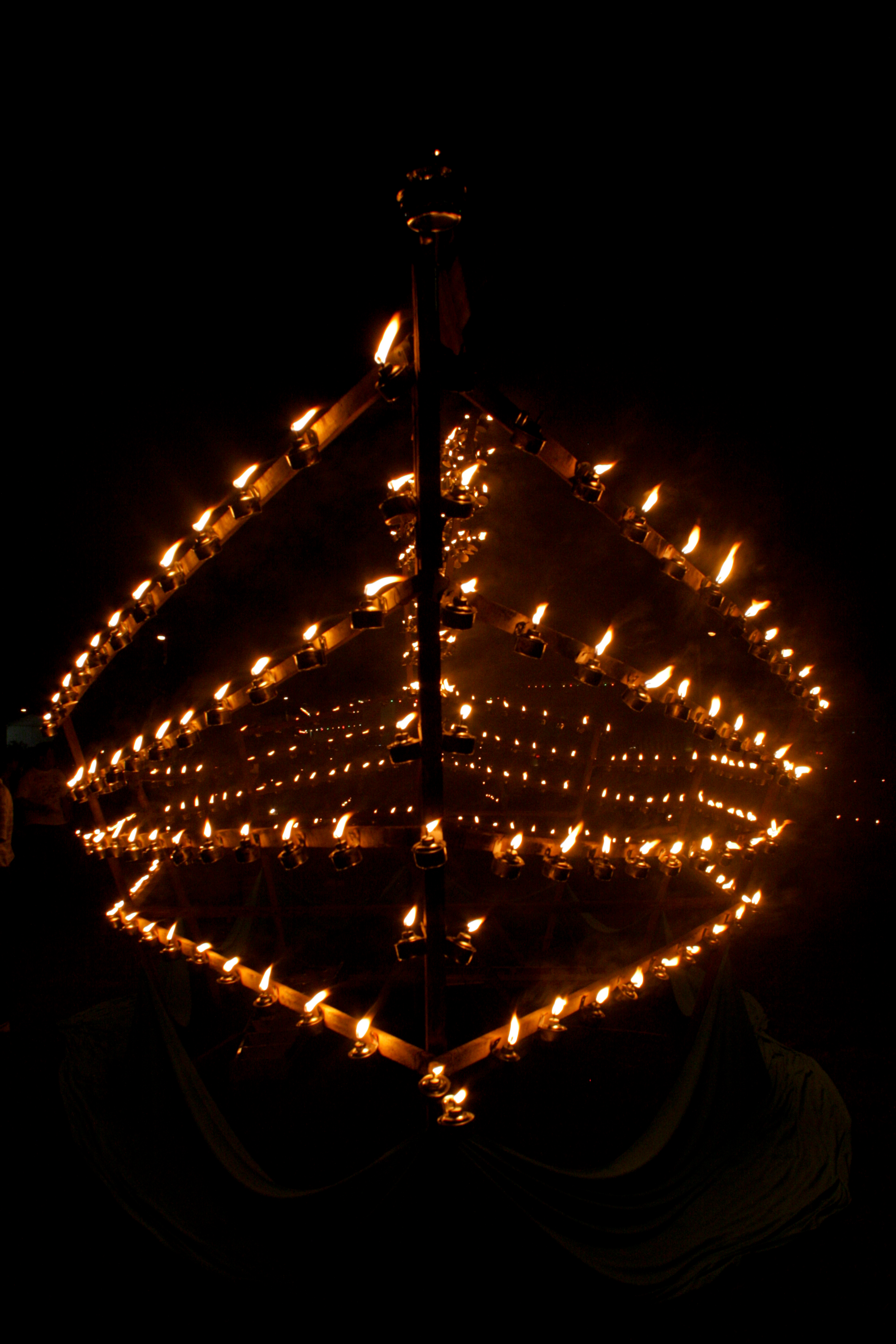
A pelita panjut structure using bamboo erected during Malam Tujuh Likur. This one, taken in Muar, is fashioned in the shape of a perahu.

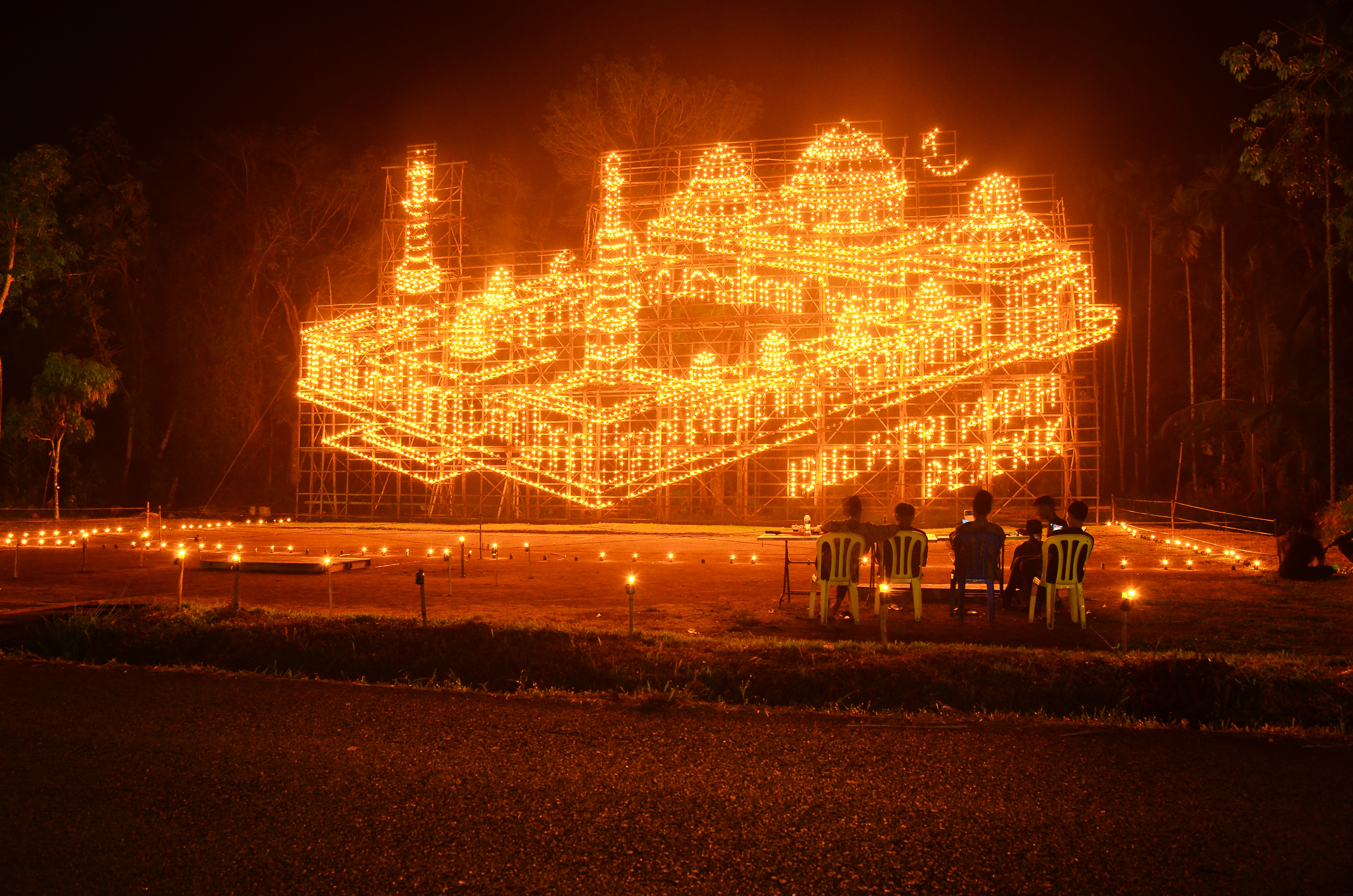
A mosque-shaped lampu colok structure in Bengkalis.

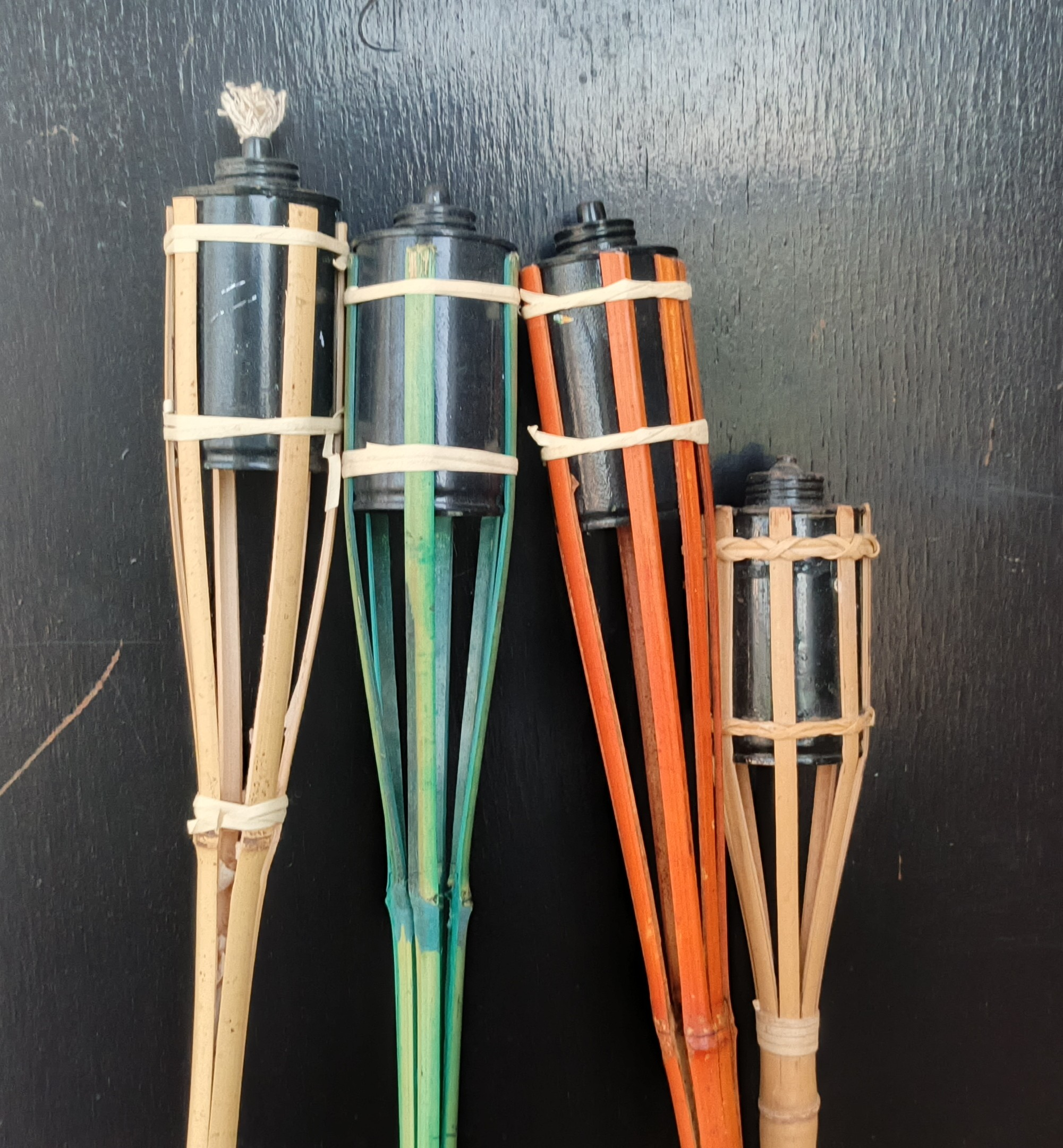
Individual pelita buluh

The tradition seemed to come from the burst of religious activities held around the village at the last third of Ramadan, in hunting for Lailatul Qadar. As the village is not yet equipped with electricity, traditional oil lamps known as pelita buluh, which are similar in build to tiki torches, were used to illuminate the streets between the house area to the mosque. In some places, competitions involving fashioning grand structures using bamboo are held with records as early as 1963. Public places such as schools are also decorated with lamps.

Some scholars believe the night will fall on 27 Ramadan, even though it is debatable. By illuminating the streets, it is intentionally done to encourage the effort to wish blessing of the Lailatul Qadar. The lamps also signify that Ramadan is nearing its end, hence reminding individuals to increase their devotion, prayers and reflection.

Among the activities done on this nights are Tahajjud, making dua, and reciting the Quran.

=== Malaysia ===
==== Negeri Sembilan ====
In Kota, the activity is not limited to lighting up the lamps. In the day, the community will execute a gotong royong of preparing traditional dishes such as dodol, rendang, lemang and bubur lambuk. The dishes are then being distributed throughout the community. For iftar, the custom of makan bersila with the dishes are done at communal space.

==== Perak ====
In Ipoh, the community will use a special form of lamp known as pelita panjut to light up all the streets in the neighborhood. Unlike the individual pelita buluh, the lamps are arranged linearly on a large bamboo structure to form shapes and words, which can be seen from afar. The activity is not only limited to the Malays, but also include the Indians and the Chinese communities to evoke the spirits of togetherness.

At Kampung Ribu, Kuala Kangsar, the village is known for its huge pelita panjut structures built in the form of a mosque. Among the inspirations include the Malacca Straits Mosque and the Ubudiah Mosque.

==== Sarawak ====
In Jepak, the night will be glazed with bertuntung tradition, where not only the streets are filled with lamps, the houses are also decorated with it. The house will be adorned with colorful lamps in different colors to further celebrate throughout the last period of Ramadan.

Nowadays, the house decorations also include the mixture of LED lamps and building temporary structures such as arches.

=== Indonesia ===
==== Riau Islands ====
At Moro District, Karimun Regency, locals have a custom of leaving their doors and windows open. They also turn on the lights as brightly as possible. During the kenduri (celebration), various foods are prepared, such as quintessential kue like wajik, bangkit, and bahulu.

At Daik, Lingga Regency, in addition of installing lights, gate ornaments with Islamic nuances are also created. Various gates are built to enliven this event. The gates are prepared by youths working together several days in advance. The event also features a bamboo cannon game at the Hang Tuah Daik Lingga Field.

==== Riau ====
It is a custom in Bengkalis Regency to light up lampu colok, which are similar to pelita panjut, to celebrate Malam Tujuh Likur.

==== Bangka Belitung Islands ====
At Mancung, Kelapa District, West Bangka Regency, the Night is also part of the annual cultural festival.

== In popular culture ==
Perang Panjut 7 Likur is a Malaysian TV drama that on air in 2024, depicting villagers going all out on panjut during the night.

A song titled Malam Tujuh Likur by singer A. Ramlie was released in 1975.

== See also ==
- Bercucul, a similar tradition practiced in Brunei
- Mantai, a pre-Ramadan and pre-Eid tradition practiced in Negeri Sembilan, Malaysia
- Ramadan in Malaysia
