= Moreh =

Moreh may refer to:

- Moreh, India, a town in Manipur, India
  - Moreh College, a college in Moreh, Manipur, India
- Elon Moreh, an Israeli settlement in the West Bank
- Givat HaMoreh, location mentioned in the Torah.
- Moreh Maru, 2016 Manipuri comedy film directed by O. Gautam and written by Laishram Santosh
- Moreh (meal), a meal traditionally served as part of Ramadan in Malaysia

== People with the surname ==
- Shmuel Moreh (1932–2017), Iraqi Jewish author and academic
- Dror Moreh (born 1961), Israeli cinematographer and director
- Eliad Moreh, Israeli survivor of a 2002 terrorist attack at Hebrew University
