= Colek =

Malay dish

Calit, colek
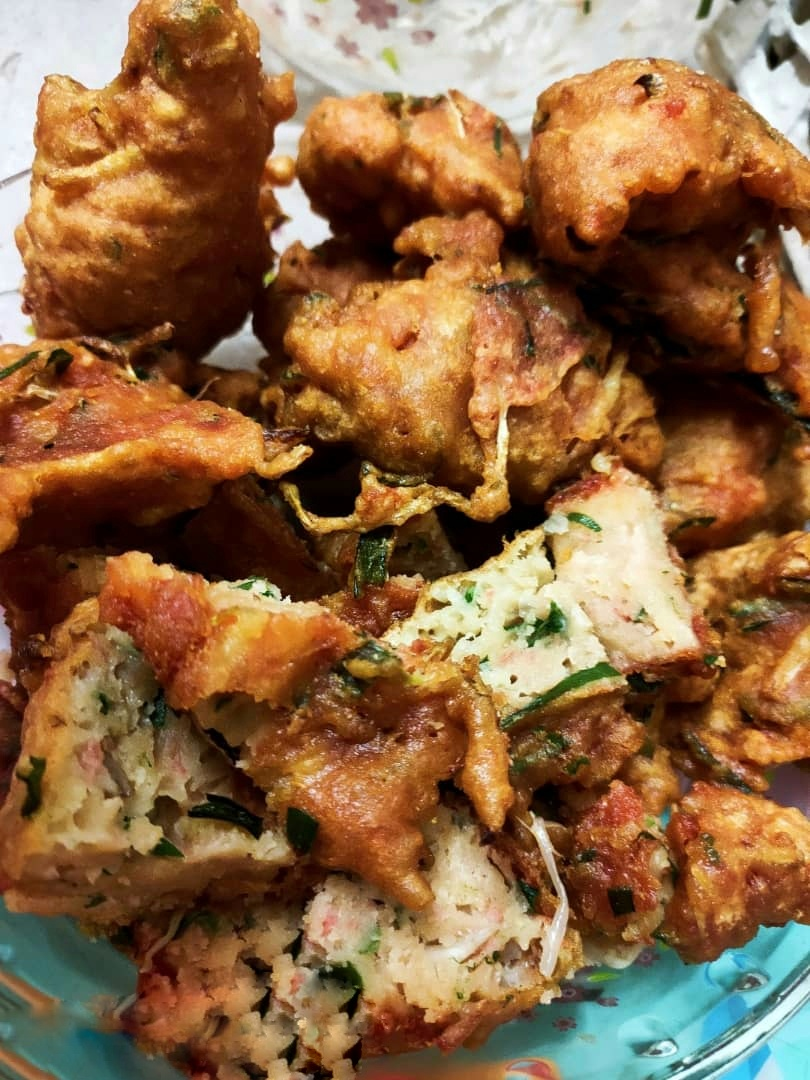
- A serving of Kelantanese colek
- Course: Salad
- Place of origin: Malaysia
- Region or state: Kelantan
- Created by: Kelantanese Malays
- Serving temperature: Hot
- Main ingredients: Variety of proteins (beef, chicken, clams or shrimp) and fruits (mango)

Calit (Jawi: چاليت, pronounced [ˈt͡ʃalit]) is a Malay mixed food salad-like dish of fruits, meats, keropok or seafood served in gravy similar to rojak particular to Kelantan known as colek (pronounced [t͡ʃɔˈlɛʔ]), it is a seasonal snack exclusive during the month of Ramadan as a post-tarawih supper (moreh) snack.

The dish is usually eaten in communaly i.e. in groups and consumed at restaurants; despite its Ramadan origins, these eatings-out has since become secularised as events joined also by non-Muslim Kelantanese.

== Etymology ==
The word colek in the Kelantanese dialect corresponds to calit in the Johor-Riau dialect continuum meaning "to smear" or "smudge" eventually meaning to dip in a gravy or sauce.

== Ingredients ==
Items mixed into colek or calit include:

- meats: fish, prawns, cow offal like tripe or lung
- egg
- processed foods: fishball, fish cake, sausage, spring rolls (popiah).
- raw vegetables: papaya (betik) and mango (pauh)

All these food items are cooked either deep-fried in batter (celup tepung), grilled or boiled before being drenched in a special chili sauce and toppings. Colek sauces are thin, sour and sweetened with brown sugar (colek manis).

== Eating as a communal activity ==
Colek is consumed mostly communally among families or friends regardless of age known locally as make colek (pronounced [ˌmãˌkɛ t͡ʃɔˈlɛʔ] i.e. makan calit 'calit feast'). Some also opted to take this moment to do this as a treat to others. Local leaders also take opportunity in these eating events as laidback avenues to engage with their constituents discussing local issues.

In recent years, the food have also been offered not only at traditional stalls, but also modern restaurants with sales of colek starting as early as 8 PM till after tarawih prayers, and some until late at night. Some restaurants also started to provide online ordering and direct-to-home delivery.

Local curfews during the COVID-19 pandemic forced halt colek-eating social gatherings. In 2020, the Kelantanese state government allows restaurants selling colek up until 10 PM only and as takeaways.
