= Air katira =

Malaysian beverage

Air katira اءير كاتيرا
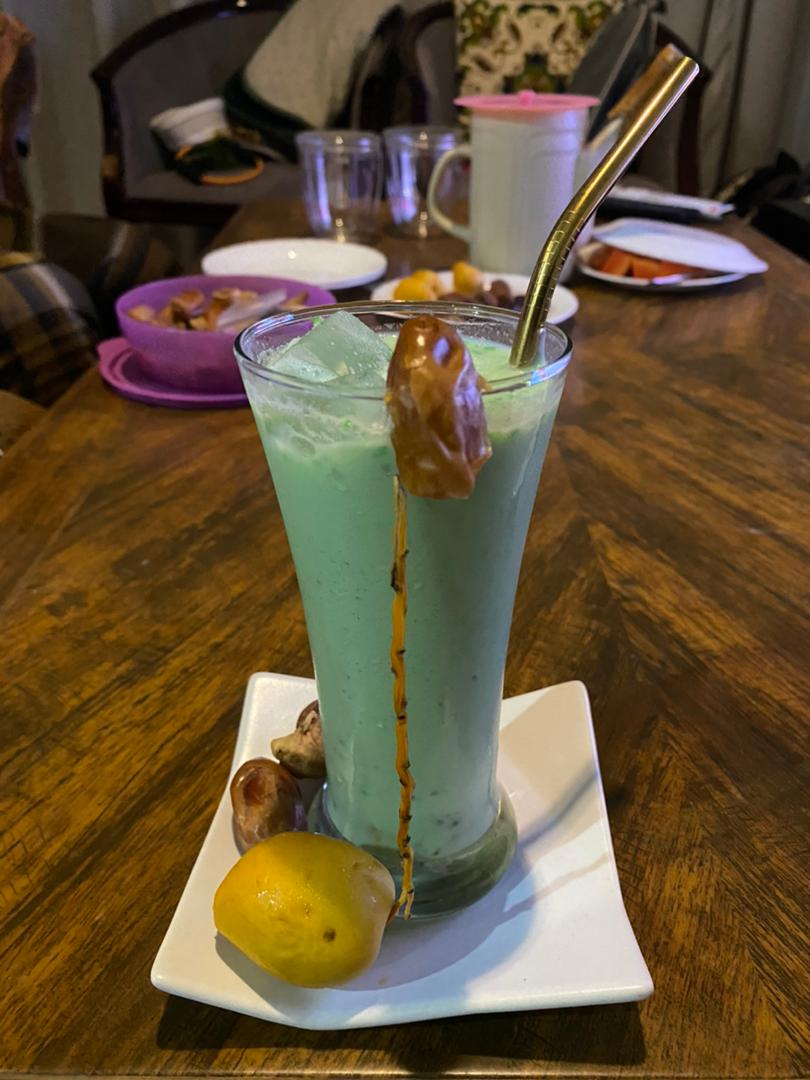
- Air katira served in a tall glass
- Alternative names: Air katirah
- Place of origin: Malaysia
- Region or state: Johor, also popular in Singapore
- Serving temperature: Cold
- Main ingredients: Tragacanth, milk, basil seeds, Scaphium affine , dates, almond, brown sugar and pandan

Air katira (Jawi: اءير كاتيرا) or simply katira is a beverage from the state of Johor, Malaysia. It is a popular drink sold exclusively during Ramadan.

== Etymology ==
The word katira is derived from Persian, meaning "sticky vegetable".

== Origin ==
The beverage gets its name from the main ingredient, tragacanth, known as "kateera", which is found in the Indian subcontinent and the Middle East. In India, goond katera (Devanagari: गोंद कतीरा) is mixed with water to produce a refreshing cooling drink. As the drink arrived in Johor, the usage of pandan adds to the iconic green color of the drink.

Air katira gained popularity after Abu Bakar Mohammed Eusoff Al Pichir started selling it in Johor Bahru in the 1980s. He learned it from Pakistani traders before modifying the recipe to accustom to local taste buds. He then relocated to Masai.

== Ingredients ==
The drink is made by combining banana-flavored cordial with milk, Scaphium affine and basil seeds. Recent variations have include the addition of grass jelly with flavours such as chocolate and air batu campur.

== Recognition ==
Air katira was recognised as an Object of National Heritage of Malaysia on 23 February 2024. It was the drink of choice for iftar by the 16th Yang di-Pertuan Agong, Sultan Abdullah.

== In popular culture ==
The drink was referenced in the title of the Singaporean TV sitcom, Bubur Masjid Air Katira.
