= Bubur pedas =

Malay porridge dish

Bubur pedas بوبور ڤدس
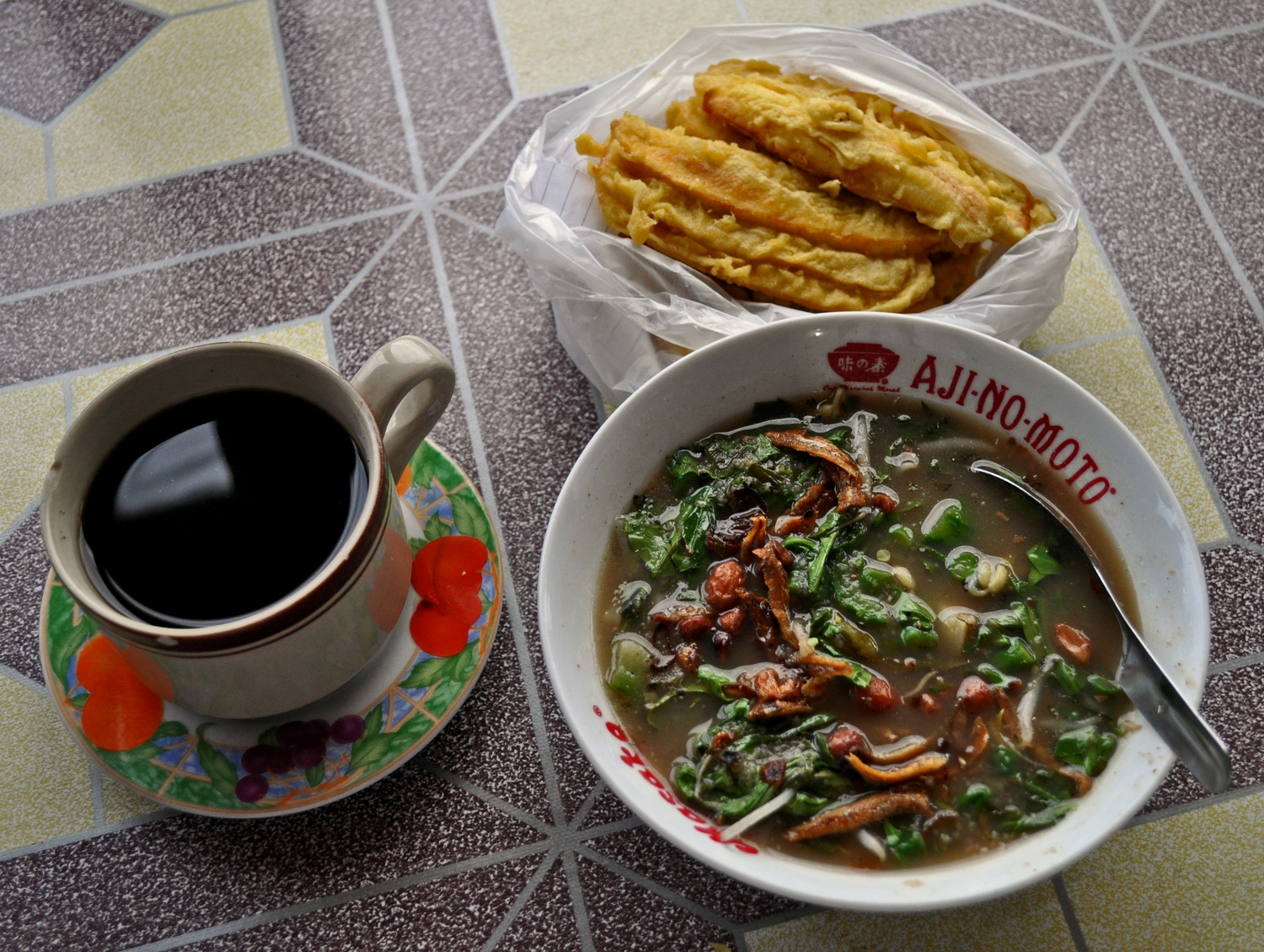
- Bubur pedas served with pisang goreng and a cup of coffee in Sambas, West Kalimantan, Indonesia
- Alternative names: Bubur lambuk
- Type: Porridge
- Course: Main course
- Place of origin: Indonesia and Malaysia
- Region or state: Sambas and Sarawak
- Created by: Malays
- Serving temperature: Hot
- Main ingredients: Bumbu: Garlic, ginger, shallots, onions, dried chilli, turmeric, lemongrass, galangal and grated coconut Bubur: Carrots, potatoes, leafy greens, mushrooms, bean curd, bamboo shoots, turmeric leaves, long beans, dried shrimp, meat and seasoning

Bubur pedas (Jawi: بوبور ڤدس) is a traditional porridge dish for the Malays both in Sambas, West Kalimantan (Indonesia) and Sarawak (Malaysia). It is usually served during Ramadan after Muslims end their fasts at iftar time.

== Ingredients ==
Bubur pedas is made from finely ground sauteed rice and grated coconut. The stock is made either from tetelan (bony meat such as ribs) or chicken broth. Bumbu spices mixture include shallot, garlic, red chili pepper, bruised lemongrass, black pepper, galangal and salam leaf (Indonesian bayleaf). A number of vegetables, among others carrot, water spinach, fern leaf and kesum leaf, long beans, bean sprouts, bamboo shoots and diced sweet potato incorporated into the pot when the porridge is cooked. Fried shallots, anchovy and peanuts are added on top of the spicy porridge when served. Key lime juice, sweet soy sauce and sambal chili paste might be added as condiments.

== History ==
This type of porridge comes from the Malays on Sambas in West Kalimantan and later adapted as the food for the Sarawak Malays.

== See also ==
- Bubur ayam
- Bubur cha cha
- Bubur lambuk
