= Bubur lambuk =

Malaysian porridge, usually served during Ramadan

Bubur lambuk بوبور لمبوق
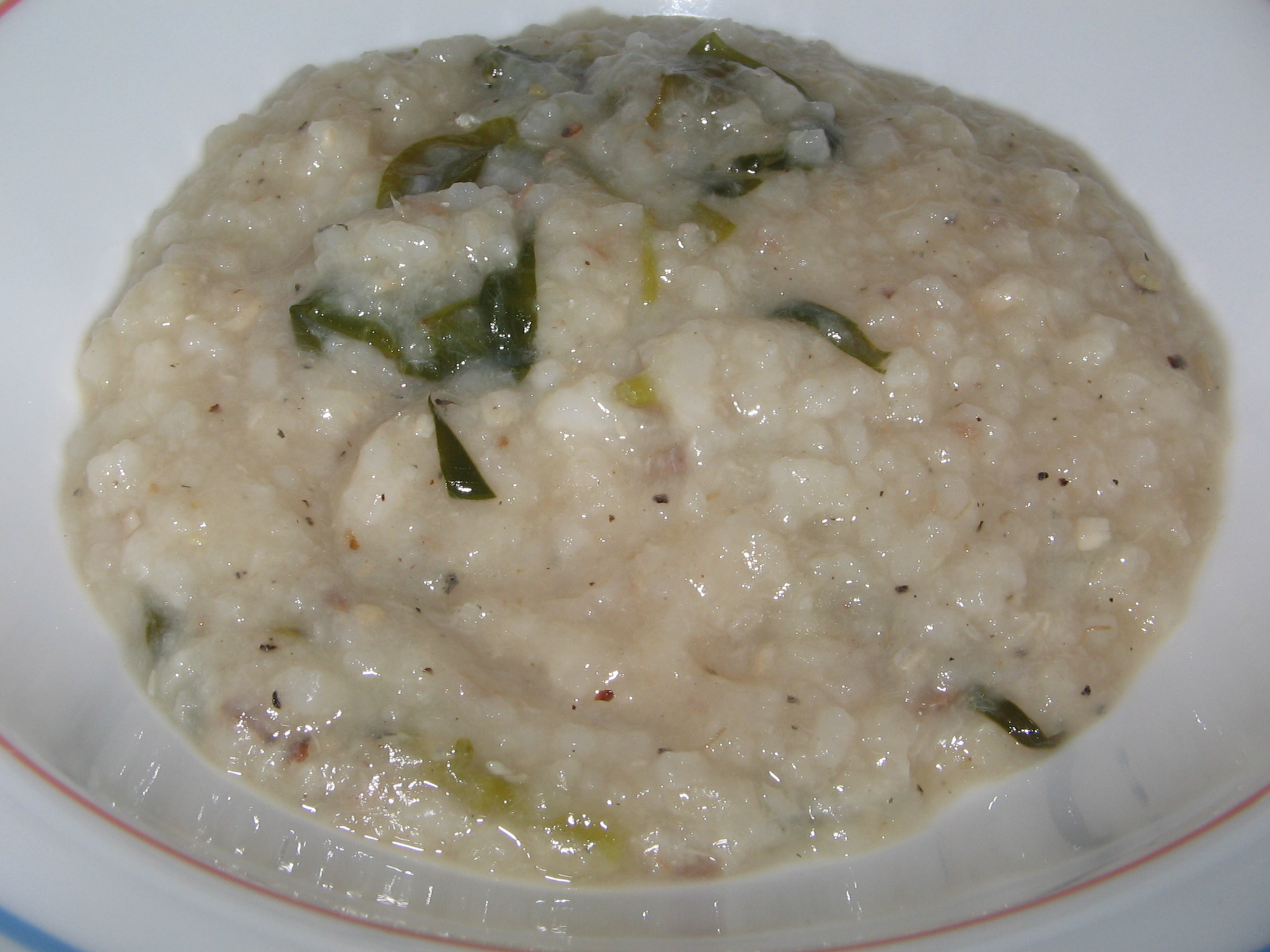
- A serving of bubur lambuk
- Alternative names: Bubur lambut
- Course: Main
- Place of origin: Malaysia
- Region or state: Nationwide, also popular among the Malay community in Riau, Riau Islands and West Kalimantan, Indonesia
- Created by: Malays
- Serving temperature: Hot
- Main ingredients: Rice, variety of proteins (beef, chicken or shrimp), vegetables, coconut milk, onion, garlic, cardamom, cumin, coriander, star anise and cinnamon
- Variations: Bubur pedas

Bubur lambuk is a spiced congee eaten during Ramadan in Malaysia. It is usually prepared by a group of people in mosques to be distributed to the masses as a free iftar meal.

== History ==
Bubur lambuk is said to have existed since the era of the Malacca Sultanate in the 15th century, specifically when Parameswara — or his name after embracing Islam, Sultan Iskandar Shah — received a visit from Emperor Hun Jen of Cambodia. He requested a type of food that was easy to swallow yet delicious and nutritious. It was then popularised by Terengganuan clerics who opened mosques in Malacca.

However, other sources mention that bubur lambuk was first served in Kampung Baru, Kuala Lumpur by Said Bank in the 1950s.

Bubur pedas also sometimes called as bubur lambuk. It is a traditional porridge among the Malays in Sambas, West Kalimantan Indonesia. Bubur pedas is made from finely ground sauteed rice and grated coconut. The stock is made either from tetelan (bony meat such as ribs) or chicken broth. Bumbu mixture include shallots, garlic, red chili pepper, bruised lemongrass, black pepper, galangal and bay leaf. A number of vegetables, among others include carrot, water spinach, fern, kesum leaf, long beans, bean sprouts, bamboo shoots and diced sweet potatoes are incorporated into the pot when the porridge is cooking. Fried shallots, anchovy and peanuts are added on top of the spicy porridge when served. Key lime juice, sweet soy sauce and sambal chili paste might be added as condiments.

== Ingredients ==
Ingredients used to make bubur lambuk often include garlic, spices and minced meat.

In Terengganu, apart from the usual ingredients, sometimes raw keropok pieces and budu are also added to impart flavor, as well as sweet potatoes, dried shrimp and others.

The ingredients were then slow cooked inside a large pot with oversized ladles. It is strirred continuously for at least four to five hours.

The process of cooking bubur lambuk was usually done in groups. It is noted to foster communal spirit among the residents and enhance the Ramadan spirits.
