= Yaroslavl Cathedral Mosque =

Mosque in Yaroslavl, Russia

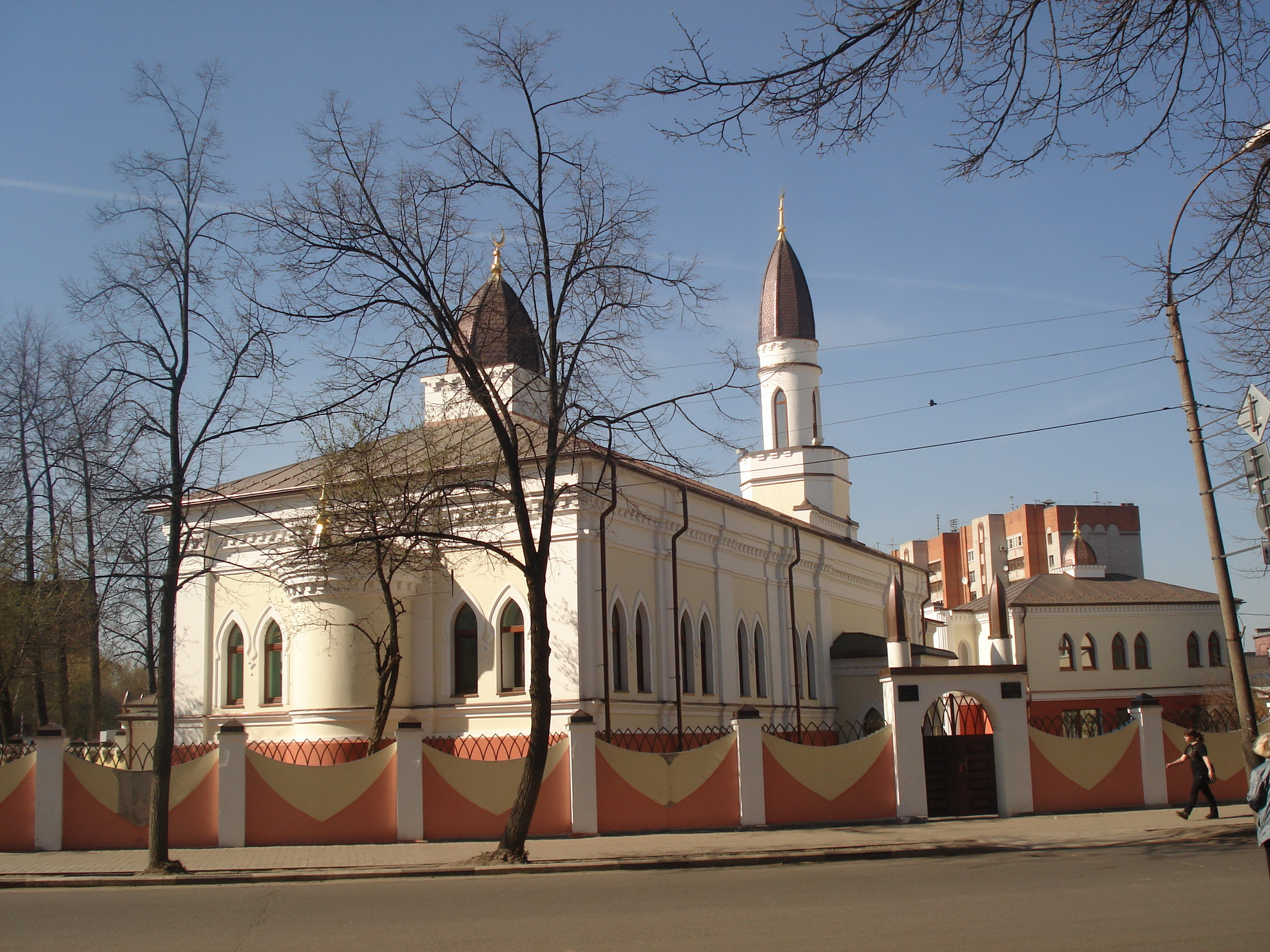

Religion
- Affiliation: Islam
- Region: Yaroslavl Oblast

Location
- Municipality: Yaroslavl
- Country: Russia
- Interactive map of Yaroslavl Cathedral Mosque
- Coordinates: 57.63611111°N 39.87569444°E

The Yaroslavl Cathedral Mosque (Russian: Ярославская соборная мечеть) is a mosque in Yaroslavl, Russia. It is located on the ulica Pobedy.

The mosque conducts regular prayers, juma, and Tarawih.
