= Ramadan in Malaysia =

Religious observance in Malaysia

Ramadan, observed as the ninth month of the Islamic lunar calendar, holds profound significance for Muslims worldwide, including Malaysia, where approximately 63.5% of the population adheres to Islam. This sacred month is observed with fasting, prayer, supplications, reflection, and community activities, reflecting Malaysia's rich cultural diversity.

== Determination ==
Just like in other countries, the start and end of Ramadan in Malaysia are determined by hilal-sighting committees, following the Islamic lunar calendar. The National Fatwa Council and state religious authorities oversee the sightings.

== Observance and religious rituals ==
During Ramadan, Malaysian Muslims fast from dawn to dusk, refraining from food, drinks, and other physical needs during daylight hours. The fast is broken at sunset with the iftar meal often initiated with dates and water, followed by a variety of traditional dishes. Iftar is locally known as buka puasa (lit. 'opening [of the] fast'). Special nightly prayers, known as Tarawih, are conducted in mosques nationwide, with some mosques inviting individuals who have memorized the entire Quran to lead the prayers, ensuring its complete recitation during the month. Additionally, after Tarawih prayers, a communal supper called moreh is often served within the mosque's compound, prepared by volunteers.In Kelantan, colek is consumed during moreh.

== Traditional cuisine ==
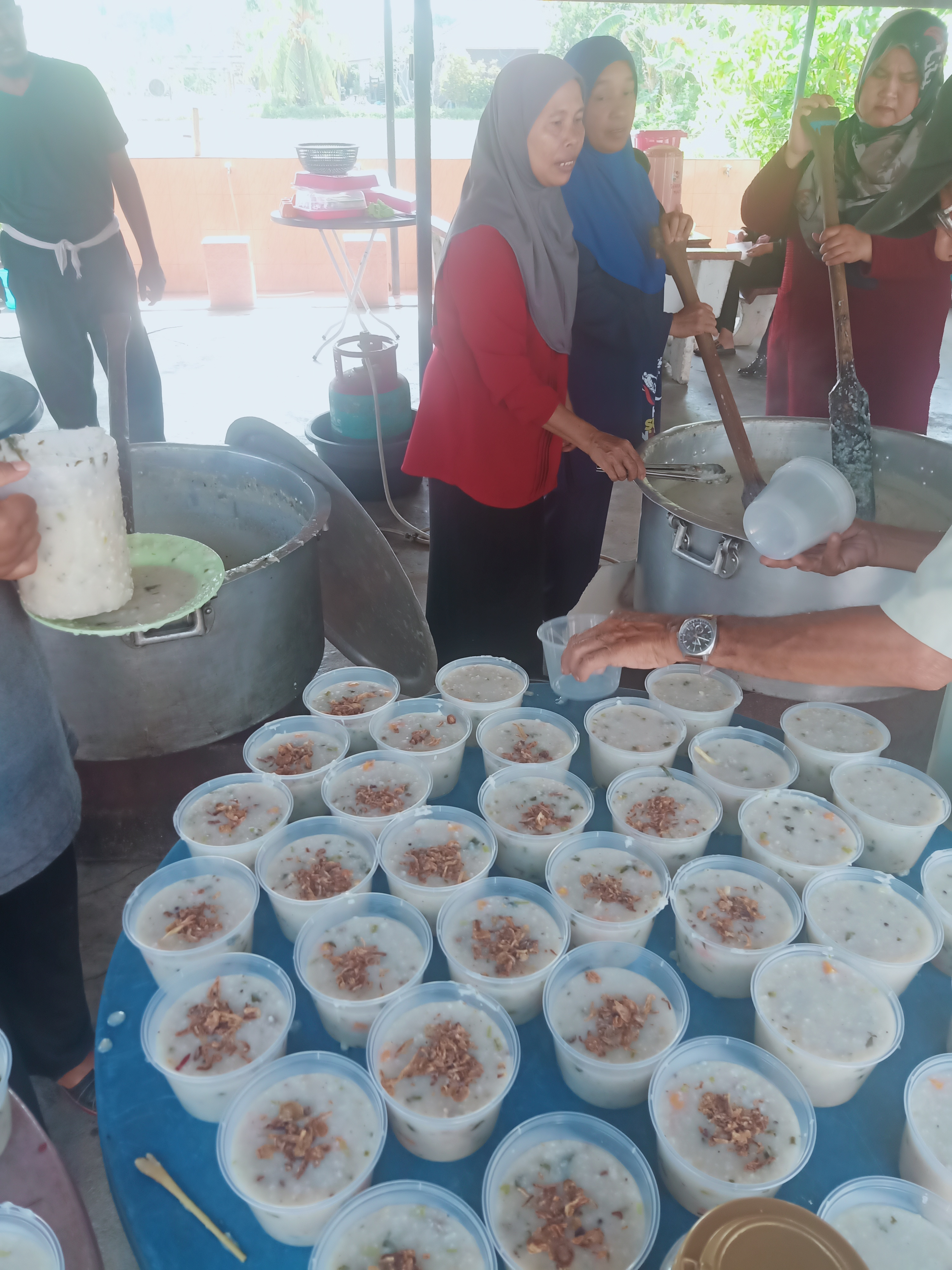
Distribution of bubur lambuk, Perlis

Malaysian Ramadan cuisine blends Malay, Indian, and Chinese influences. A notable Malaysian tradition during Ramadan is the making and distribution of bubur lambuk, a special porridge cooked with coconut milk, meat, spices, and other ingredients. This dish exemplifies the communal spirit of Ramadan, as it is often shared among neighbors and communities. Other dishes also include an assortment of kuih — traditional confections like kuih lapis (layered cake) and onde-onde (glutinous rice balls). Savory dishes also often include satay, rendang, and lemang — grilled meats and coconut rice, popular for festive meals. Beverages like air katira and sirap bandung offer a refreshing start to break the fast.

== Economic impact and food prices ==
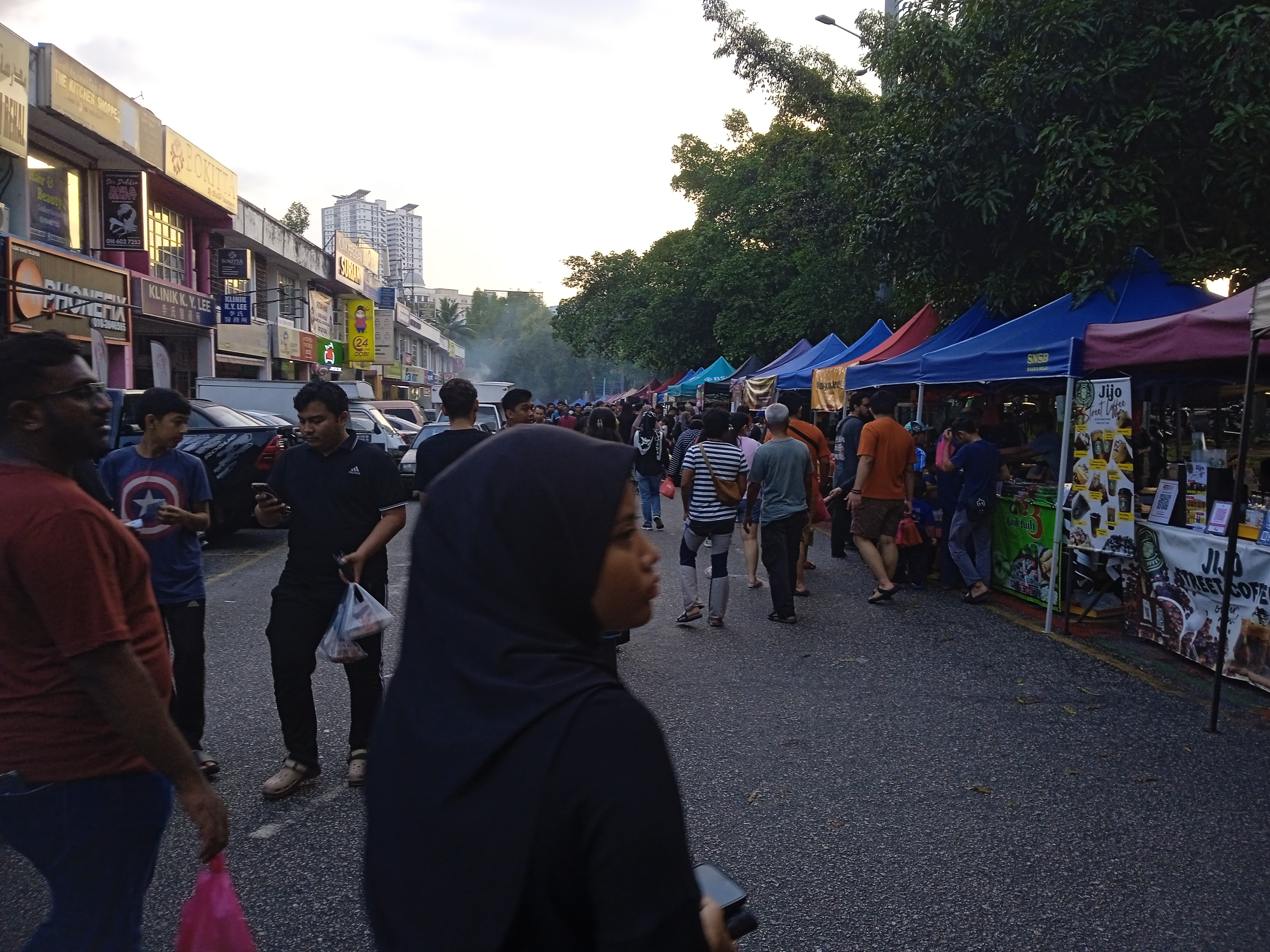
A Ramadan bazaar in Kota Damansara, Selangor

Ramadan bazaars flourish during this period. The demand for food during Ramadan often leads to discussions on price fluctuations. A study by the Khazanah Research Institute concluded that while food prices tend to rise during Ramadan, the increase is not statistically significant. However, individual experiences vary; for instance, a report highlighted a man's expenditure of RM 150 on just nine food items at a Ramadan bazaar, sparking debates on affordability. Additionally, the government has initiated crackdowns on price gouging during the holy month to ensure fair practices in food bazaars.

== Public holidays and work adjustments ==
The first day of Ramadan is a public holiday in Johor, Kedah, and Malacca. Many businesses adjust working hours to accommodate fasting employees, allowing early departures or flexible schedules.

== Cultural practices and tourism ==
Ramadan is a time of increased charity and generosity in Malaysia. Donation boxes and campaigns for zakat (obligatory almsgiving) are prevalent in public places, encouraging both locals and visitors to participate in charitable activities.

In certain states such as Negeri Sembilan, residents will work together to slaughter cows and distribute the meats among themselves. Some even cook festive dishes such as lemang and rendang. The tradition is known as mantai.

The country's unique Ramadan traditions also attract tourists; in 2025, Malaysia anticipated welcoming between 250,000 and 400,000 tourists during the holy month, drawn by the vibrant Islamic cultural festivities and religious tourism offerings.

== Challenges and controversies ==
In 2024, the authorities crack down and impose fines for breaking the Ramadan fast; those caught eating and drinking in broad daylight will face fines of up to 1,000 Malaysian ringgit (about $200) and up to a year in prison. Non-Muslims caught selling food, drinks or tobacco to Muslims during fasting hours will also face fines.

In 2025, a viral incident dubbed the 'Ramadan slap' involved an elderly Malay man confronting a non-Muslim for not fasting, leading to widespread discussions on social media about religious tolerance and societal norms.

== See also ==
- Ramadan in Pakistan
- Ramadan in Iran
- Ramadan in Turkey
- Ramadan in the United Kingdom
