= Bercucul =

Malay and Kedayan tradition

Bercucul (Jawi: برچوچول) is a tradition practiced by Malays and Kedayan in Brunei and Labuan, Malaysia. The tradition involved lighting up colorful oil lamps known as pelita, around the neighborhood area during the last ten days of Ramadan with its peak on 27 Ramadan. It is a symbol of accepting the guest and celebrating incoming travellers to celebrate Eid at their hometown.

In addition, it is also observed to celebrate the incoming Ma'al Hijrah.

== Etymology ==
Bercucul is derived from cucul, means "lamp" in Brunei Malay dialect.

== Traditions ==
The tradition claimed to start in the 1960s. The lamp or called as cucul are made from bamboo and adorned with beautiful design carvings. Modern variation include made from plastic. Alongside those, candles, big colored lamps and small decorative blinking lamps are also used to decorate house or along the highways. It is decorated either outside or inside the house.

Nationwide, competition involving bercucul is organized by local committee with participation from kampung or villagers.

== See also ==
- Malam Tujuh Likur
