= Mantai =

Ramadan and Eid customs in Negeri Sembilan, Malaysia

Mantai (Jawi: منتاي) or mogang poso is a Ramadan and Zulhijjah tradition that is unique to the state of Negeri Sembilan, Malaysia. It refers to the activity of slaughtering cattle among the residents and distributing the meats among the community members on eves of both Eid al-Fitr and Eid al-Adha supplyinh enough food to celebrate the festivity of the month. The practice is also popular in several parts of neighbouring states like Beranang, Selangor (who call it mogang) and Alor Gajah, Malacca, both culturally closer to the Minangkabau than the Malay.

== Etymology ==
The word mantai in the Negri Sembilan dialect is truncated from membantai ("to slaughter") as in slaughtering the cattle for meat. Mogang poso roughly translates to "Welcoming The Fast" (cf. memegang puasa in standard Malay).

Cincang pelupuh is also a term that associated with mantai referring to the action of cutting (cincang) coconut fronds (pelepah) to place beef and buffalo meat that has been cleaned.

== Practice ==
On Mantai day, the cows are prepared beforehand and slaughtered en masse in accordance with halal guidelines. Historically, villagers would pool their money to buy a cow or buffalo, slaughter it together (gotong-royong), and divide the meat among themselves.

The traditions have evolved to small stalls being set up along the busy main roads to provide easy access to purchase the meat. Butchers will prepare the day before to the flux of meat buyers. Some also note that the Mantai meat is cheaper compared to those in the marketas the meats are being auctioned to the residents with attractive and reasonable prices to intensify the festive atmosphere. After the meats are distributed, residents would organise gotong-royong where all of them would whip up dishes to be eaten using the slaughtered meat. Some of the dishes include rendang, soup, and masak lemak cili api, with lemang and cooked rice being the quintessential accompaniments.

The tradition have been noted to foster familial spirit and togetherness. Individuals would apply leave to celebrate the event with family members and work together in butchering the meat and preparing the dishes.

During the COVID-19 pandemic, the tradition were done through hybrid method, where residents booked the meats online before they are being delivered to their houses. Nevertheless, the tradition remain resilient. In recent times, the Negeri Sembilan state government also organises Mantai Raya Perdana ("Grand Eid Mantai") which is done statewide.

== See also ==
- Malam Tujuh Likur – Malaysian and Indonesian traditions on the final week of Ramadan
- Ramadan in Malaysia
