= Falooda =

Mughlai cold dessert

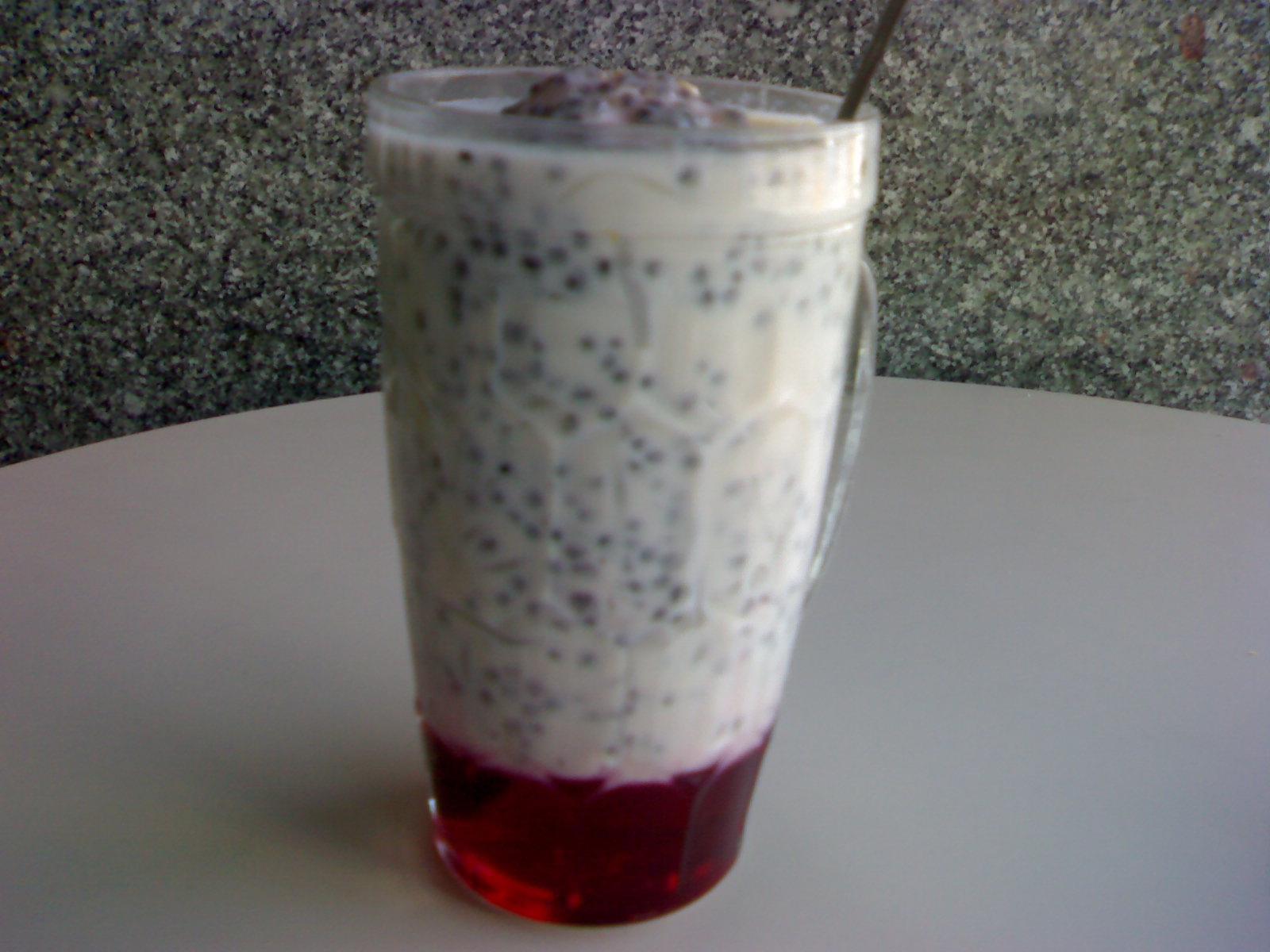
- Falooda with kulfi, rose syrup, and basil seeds (sabja seeds)
- Type: Drink
- Course: Beverage
- Region or state: South Asia
- Serving temperature: Cold
- Main ingredients: Milk, rose syrup, vermicelli, sweet basil
- Similar dishes: Bandung, nam maenglak, alouda, Bombay crush

A falooda or faluda (IPA: [faːluːd̪aː]) is a Mughlai cold dessert made with vermicelli. It has origins in the Persian dish faloodeh, variants of which are found across West, Central, South and Southeast Asia. Traditionally, it is prepared by mixing rose syrup, vermicelli, and sweet basil seeds with milk, often served with kulfi. The vermicelli used for preparing falooda is made from wheat, arrowroot, cornstarch, or sago.

== History ==
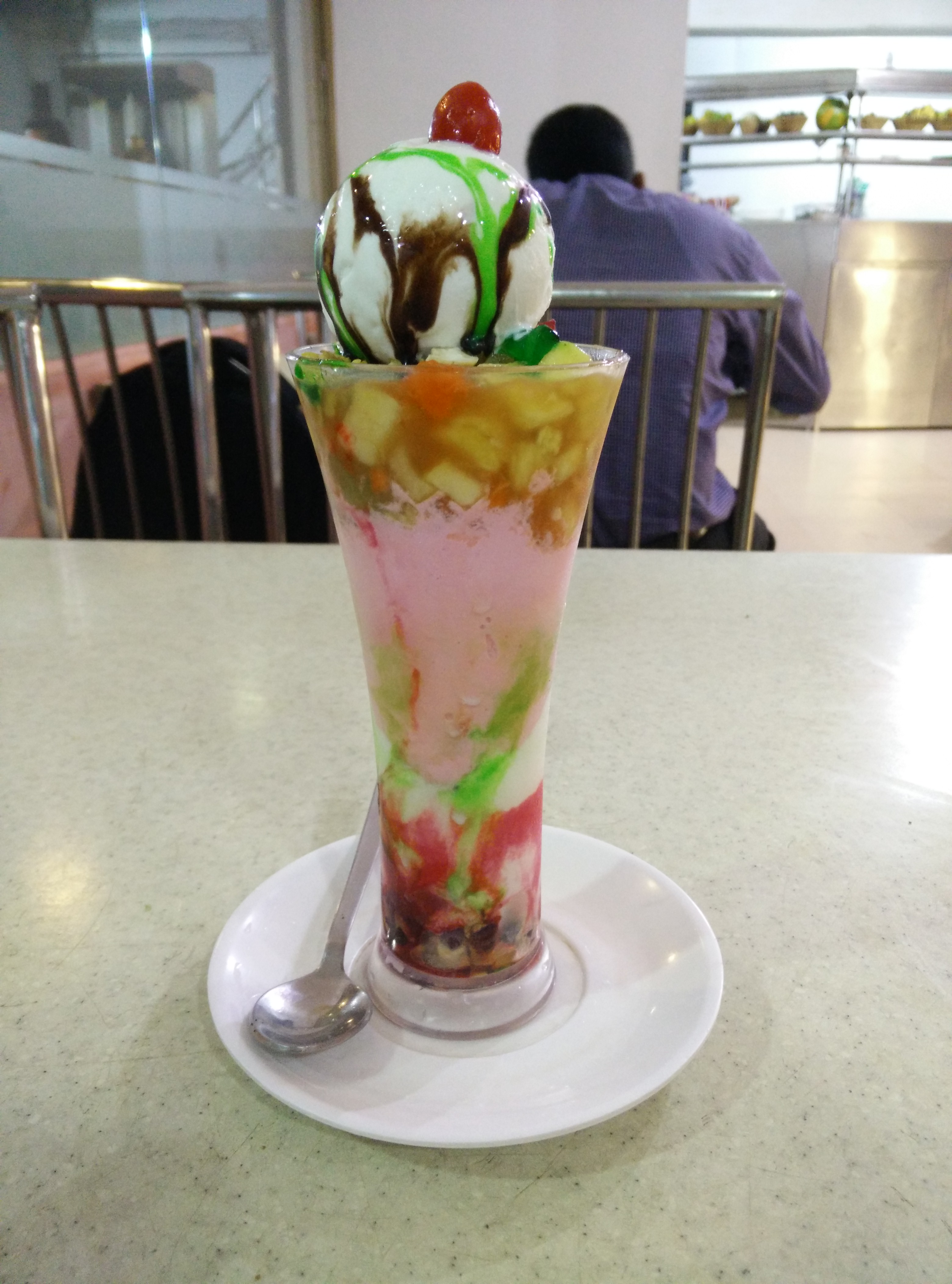
A version of falooda with fruits, nuts, and an ice cream topping

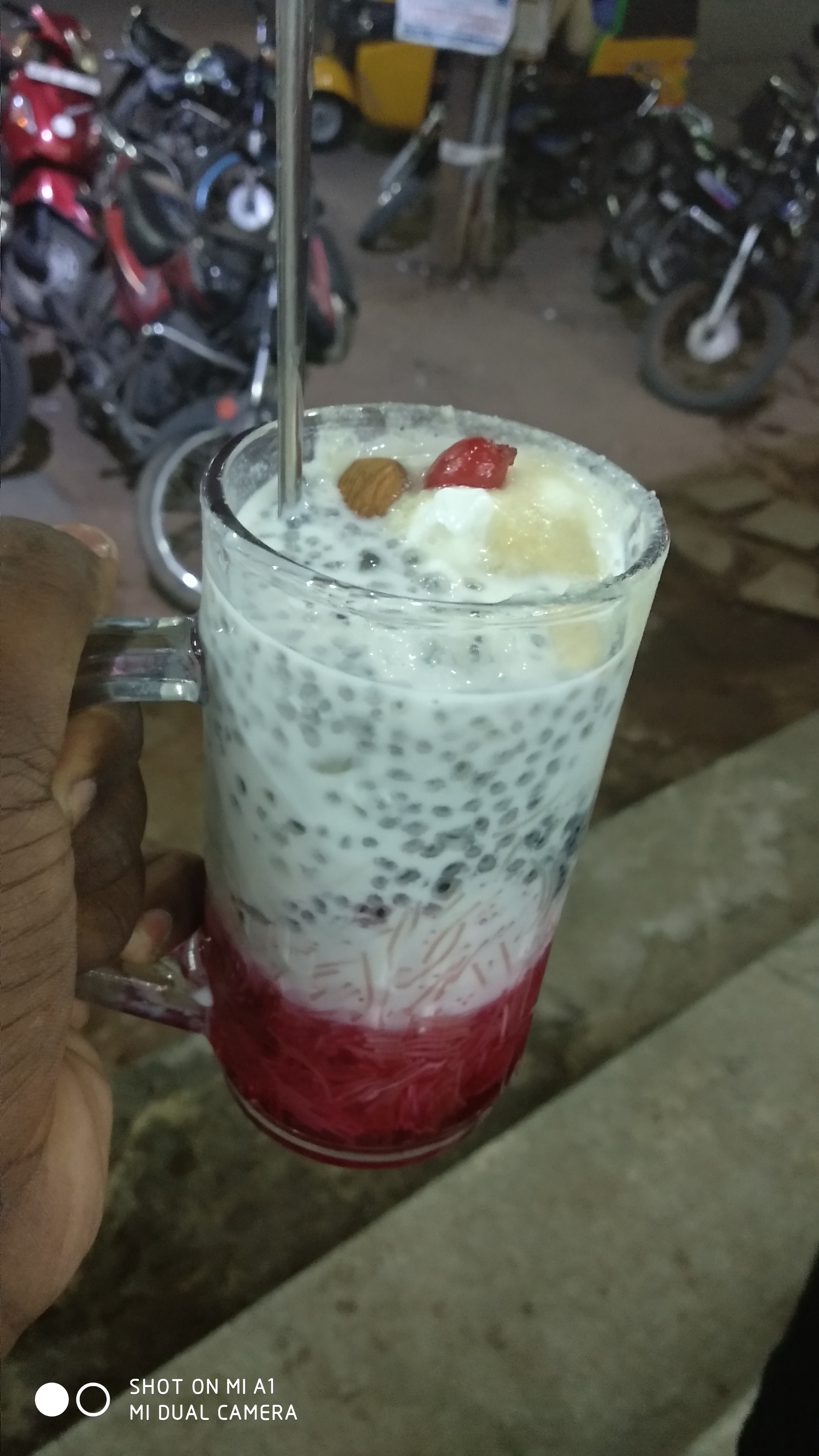
Bawarchi special falooda

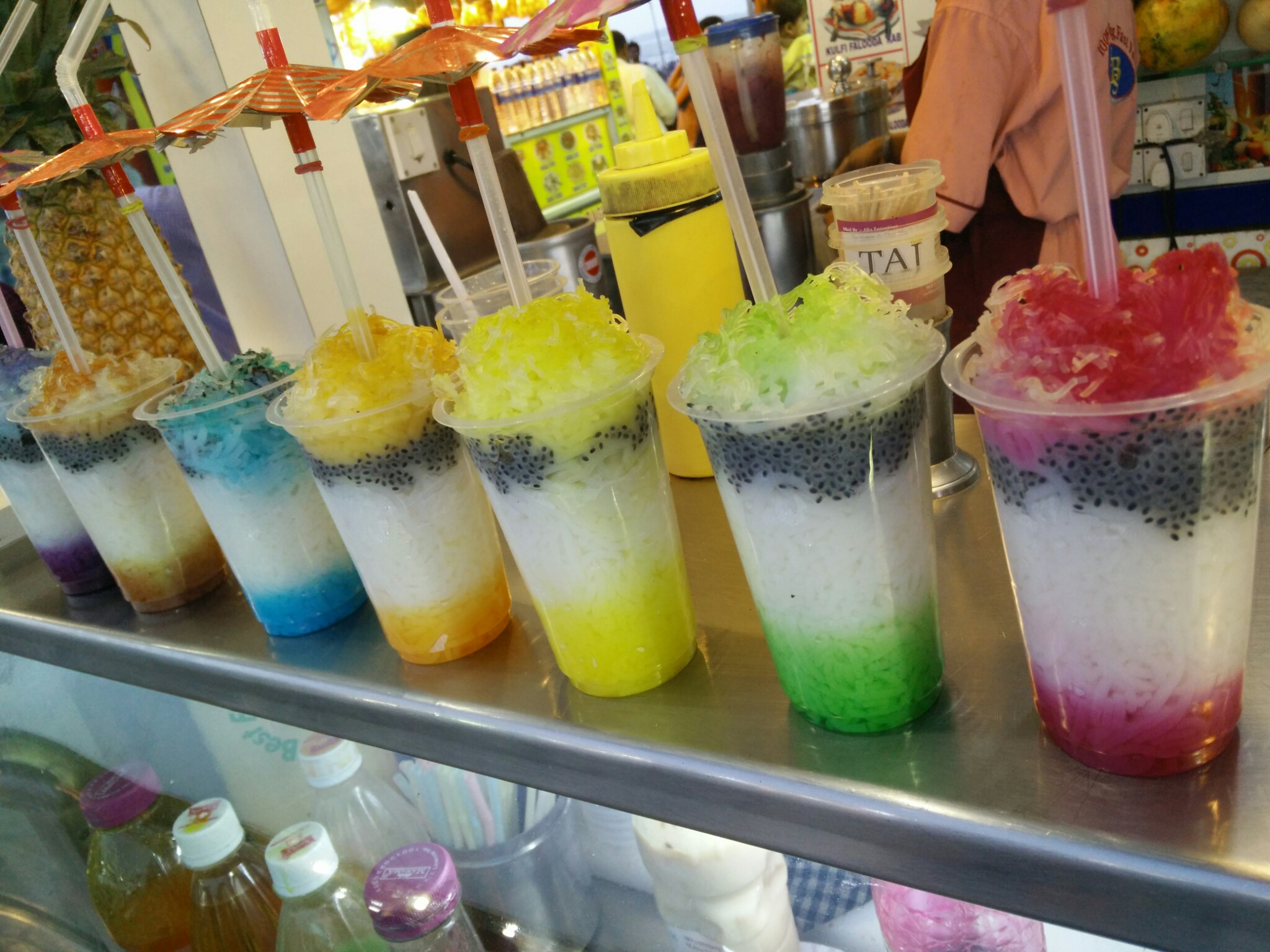
Falooda from a shop at Juhu Beach, Mumbai, India

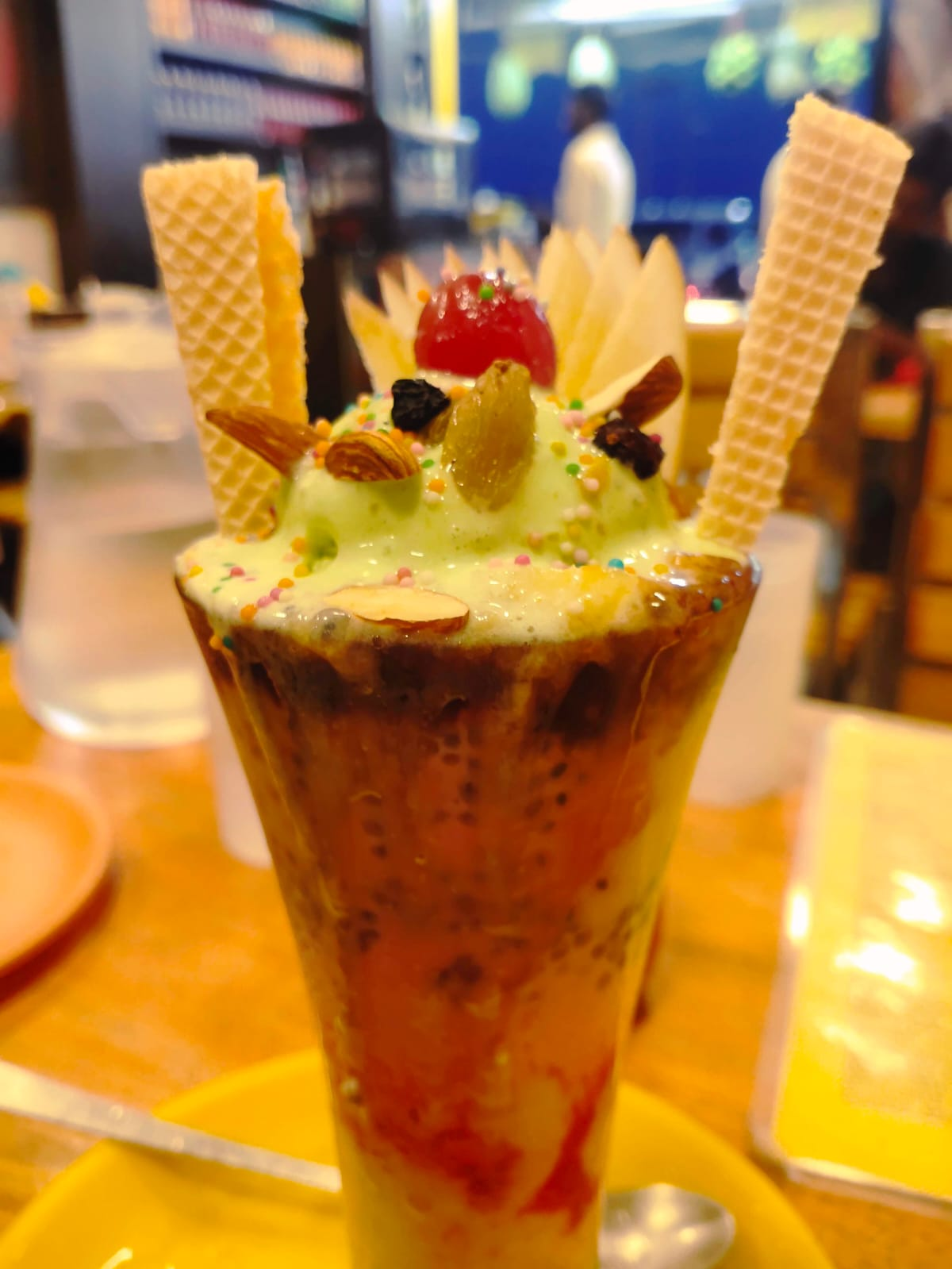
Falooda from Chennai, India

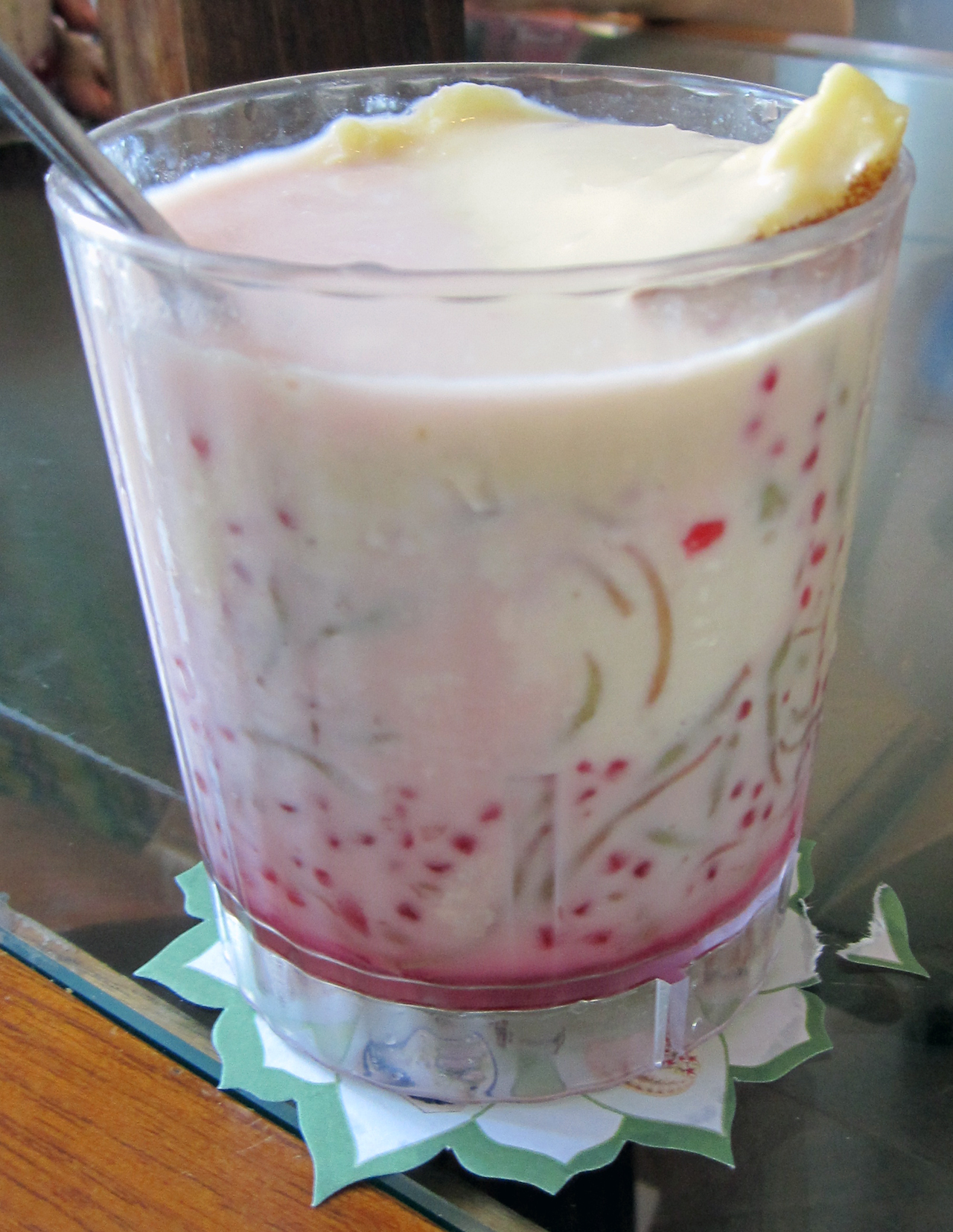
Phaluda from Myanmar

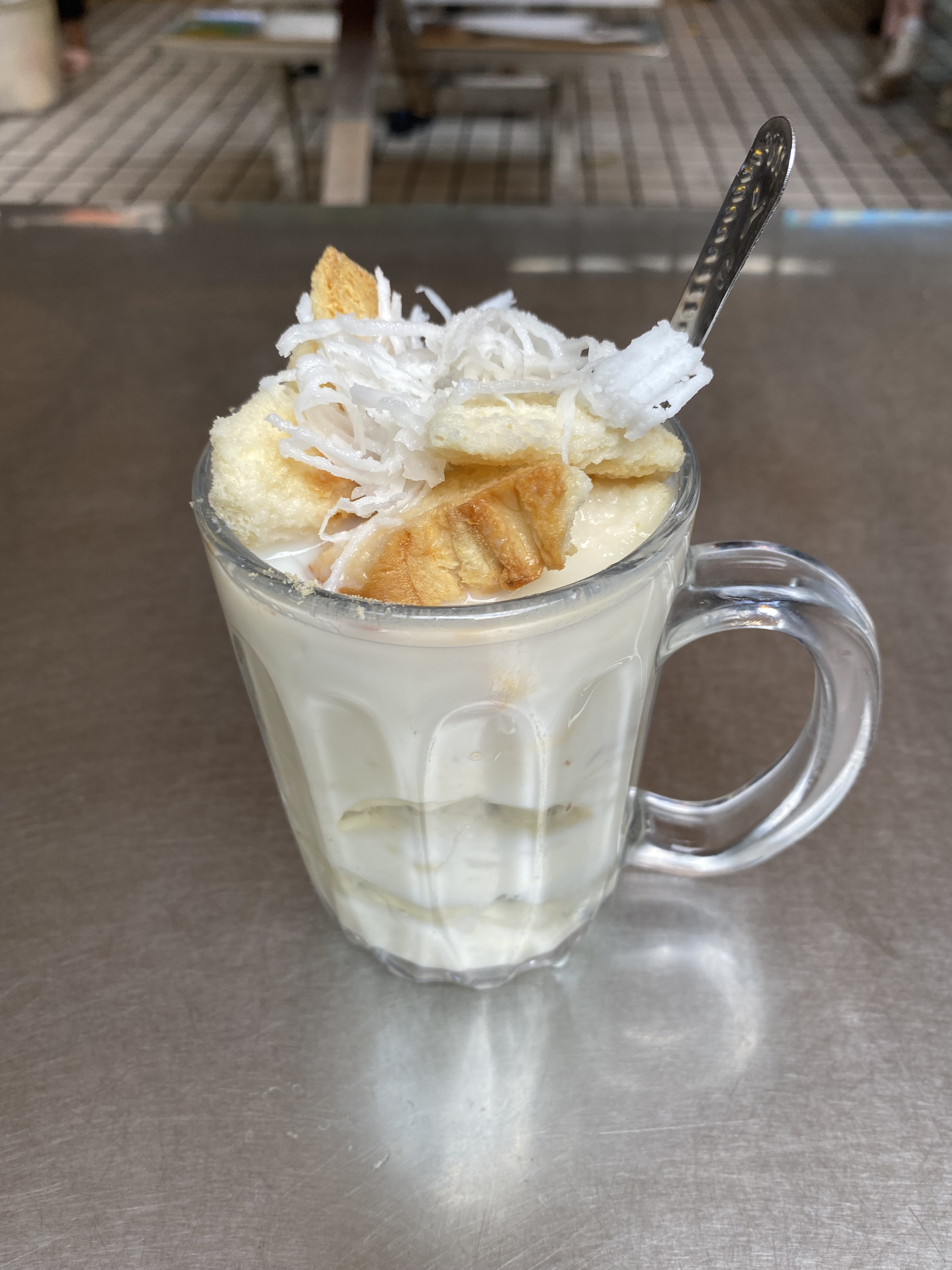
Paoluda from Mangshi, Yunnan, China

The origin of falooda goes back to Iran (Persia), where a similar dessert, faloodeh, is still popular. The dessert came to late Medieval India with the many Central Asian dynasties that invaded and settled in South Asia in the 16th to 18th century. The present form of falooda was developed in the Mughal Empire and spread with its conquests. The Persianate rulers who succeeded from the Mughals patronized the dessert with their own adaptations, specifically in Hyderabad Deccan and the Carnatic areas of present-day India. This beverage is now a part of Pakistani cuisine, Afghan cuisine, Burmese cuisine, Indian cuisine, Bangladeshi cuisine and Sri Lankan cuisine and is served on weddings and other occasions. In Sri Lanka, predominantly referred to as 'Faluda', but 'Falooda' is also accepted, (ෆලුඩා / ஃபலூடா) is often consumed as a popular dairy refreshment.

== Metaphorical references ==
In idiomatic Hindustani, faluda is sometimes used as a reference to something that has been shredded, which is an allusion to the vermicelli noodles. For example, someone who falls into disrepute might say that his or her izzat has been turned to faluda (Hindi: इज़्ज़त का फ़ालूदा, Urdu: عزت کا فالودہ, romanized: izzat ka faluda), which is roughly equivalent to saying "my reputation is shot".

== Variants ==
- Some Pakistani versions consist of translucent wheat-starch noodles, and flavoured syrup.
- In Myanmar, phaluda (ဖာလူဒါ) is made with basil seeds, grass jelly, egg pudding, vanilla ice cream, sweetened milk and rose syrup. More elaborate versions also incorporate sago, rice noodles, fruit jelly, and chopped fruit.
- In southern Bangladesh, falooda is made with pandan extract, pistachios, sago pearls, creamed coconut, mango, milk and vermicelli, and may even include strong black tea.
- Malaysia and Singapore have a similar drink called bandung.
- Thailand has a similar drink, nam maenglak (น้ำแมงลัก), which is made with lemon basil seeds, shredded jelly, tapioca pearls, and Job's tears mixed with sugar, water, and rose water.
- In Sri Lanka, basil seeds, jelly cubes, are used to garnish faluda (also spelled 'falooda'), and the drink is often topped with ice cream. Other faluda variants like mango and nelli/nelikai (gooseberry) flavoured faluda also exist.
- The Iraqi Kurds make a version with thicker vermicelli.
- The Mauritian version is called alouda.
- A variant known as a "Bombay crush" is popular amongst South African Indians.
- In Guyana, a solid gelatin-like version is made with condensed milk.

== See also ==
- Cendol
