= Ramadan in Afghanistan =

Religious observance in Afghanistan

Ramadan in Afghanistan holds profound religious and cultural significance in Afghanistan, where the majority of the population practices Islam. Ramadan marked by unique traditions, charitable acts, and communal gatherings, and acts of charity.

== Dates and lunar sighting ==
Ramadan's timing in Afghanistan follows the Islamic lunar calendar, with its start and end dates determined by the sighting of the crescent moon (Hilal). Discrepancies in dates may arise due to regional moon-sighting committees, such as Afghanistan’s local religious authorities or alignment with Saudi Arabia’s announcements. Variations may occur compared to neighboring countries like Pakistan.

== Observance and traditions ==
The first day of Ramadan is always a public holiday in Afghanistan. Similar to other Muslim-majority countries, restaurants and cafes remain closed during daylight hours throughout the month.

During Ramadan, Afghan Muslims observe fasting from dawn until sunset, abstaining from food, drink, and other physical needs. The fast is broken at sunset with a meal known as Iftar. Traditional Afghan Iftars often begin with Shorba, a comforting soup made from slow-cooked vegetables and meat, followed by fresh bread and dried fruits—offering a simple yet hearty start to the evening feast.

In addition to fasting, Afghans devoutly attend mosques, dedicating several hours to prayer and reflection. Community services and acts of charity are emphasized during this time, reflecting the spirit of generosity and compassion central to Ramadan.

=== Cultural practices ===
One unique cultural practice observed in Herat, a city in western Afghanistan, is "Ramazan Khwani," or Ramadan singing. This historic tradition continues to be a vibrant aspect of cultural life, preserving the rich heritage of the region.

== Communal and charitable activities ==
Ramadan in Afghanistan emphasizes community and charity. Families often host communal iftars, inviting neighbors and those less fortunate. Mosques and charitable organizations distribute food to the needy, ensuring everyone can partake in the blessings of the month.

A unique tradition involves playing the dohol (a type of drum) in the early morning to wake people for suhoor.

== Challenges amid celebration ==
Despite the celebratory nature of Ramadan, many Afghans face significant challenges. The country grapples with one of the world's largest humanitarian crises, exacerbated by rising hunger, poverty, and joblessness. These issues overshadow the holy month for numerous families who struggle daily to meet basic needs.

However, initiatives such as Islamic Relief's Ramadan distributions offer some relief. These efforts bring hope to vulnerable families, providing essential supplies and support during the deepening hunger crisis.
