= Budu =

Budu may refer to:

== Languages ==
- Budu language, a language of the Democratic Republic of the Congo
- Budu Dogon, a language of Mali
- Budu language (China), a language of China

== Other uses ==
- Budu people, an ethnic group of the Democratic Republic of the Congo
- Budu (sauce), a fish sauce
- Budu Cantemir, a village in Romania
