= Ramadan tent =

Venue erected during Ramadan to eat Iftar

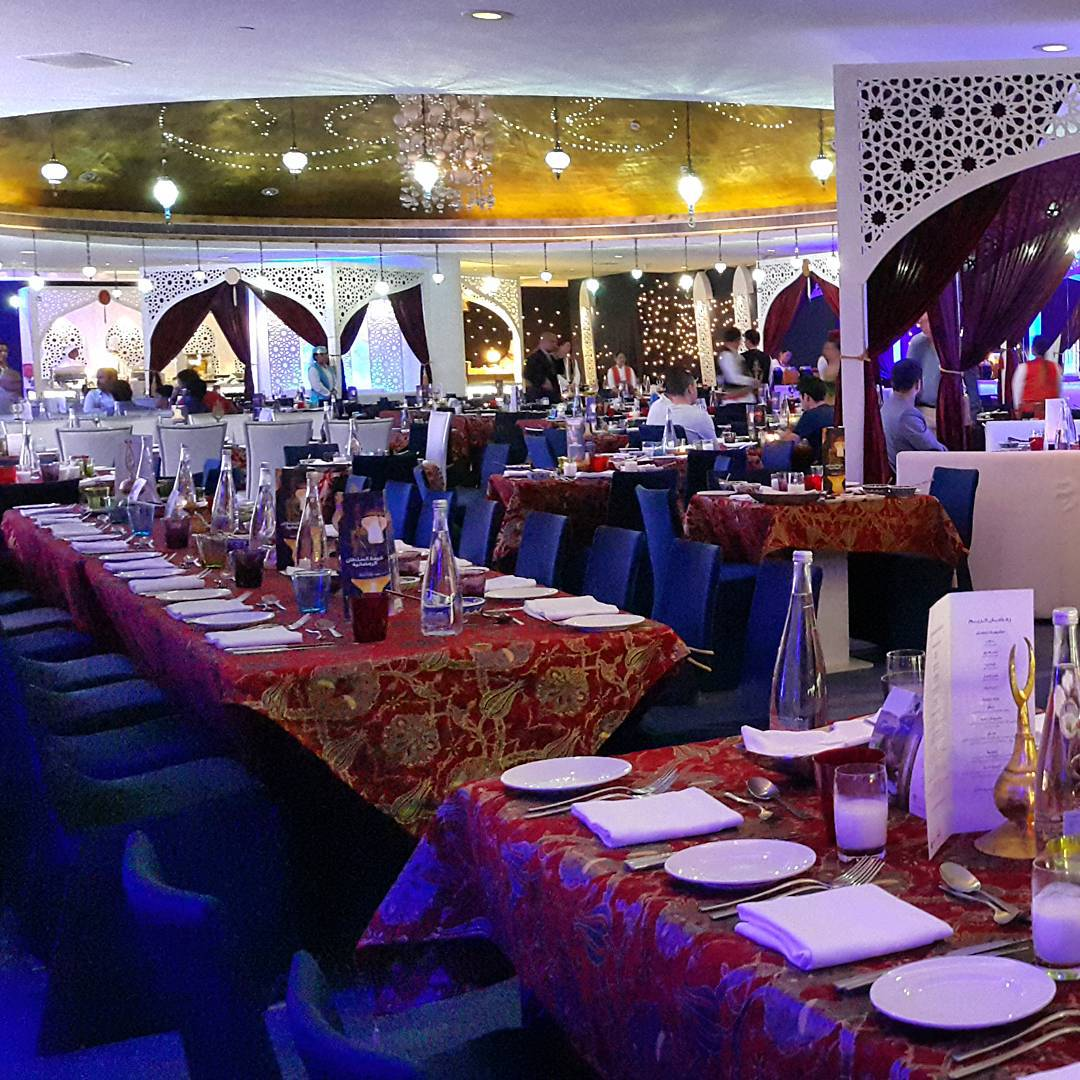
An upscale Ramadan tent in Doha

A Ramadan tent is a venue erected during the month of Ramadan for people to eat the daily Iftar meal. They are common across the Middle East and can be found anywhere there are communities of Muslims. Ramadan tents provide a place for people to meet with friends and family after the daily fast is broken at sunset. People gather there to eat Iftar, drink tea, and smoke shisha. Ramadan tents are traditionally a family or neighborhood affair in the Middle East. A Jordanian journalist described a typical Ramadan tent thus in 2008:

Under the fluffy colorful ceiling of the big tent, you can treat yourself and friends to various types of sweets, entertainment and distraction until the very early hours of the morning, while playing game after game of cards. A musical band with a leading singer can play classical pieces of Arab music. ... Waiters are dressed in special 19th- or 18th-century attire with the red cylinder-shaped hat better known as "tarboush." They offer you, in addition to the very popular argeelah, a rich assortment of little snacks.

— Salim Ayoub Quna

In recent years, restaurants and hotels have begun running Ramadan tents to attract customers. Most luxury hotels (4- or 5-star) hotels in Jordan, the UAE, and other countries set up Ramadan tents. These for-profit Ramadan tents typically charge an entrance fee of $10 to $15, though more expensive ones at nice hotels will charge $36 or more. More upscale Ramadan tents also often have music or other entertainment. The highly commercial and materialistic nature of these Ramadan tents has led many in the Middle East to criticize them for cheapening the holiday and in particular for associating "corporate-sponsored materialism with morality." However, some do not share this negative opinion of Ramadan tents; the aforementioned Jordanian journalist writes that:

Maybe the tent is a symbol of open space and freedom of movement that our modern way of life in the city is stripped of ... Living in peace, quiet, and close to nature makes you feel closer to God and religion, and since I miss these things in my real life out there, being here under this tent restores part of the harsh imbalance.

— Salim Ayoub Quna

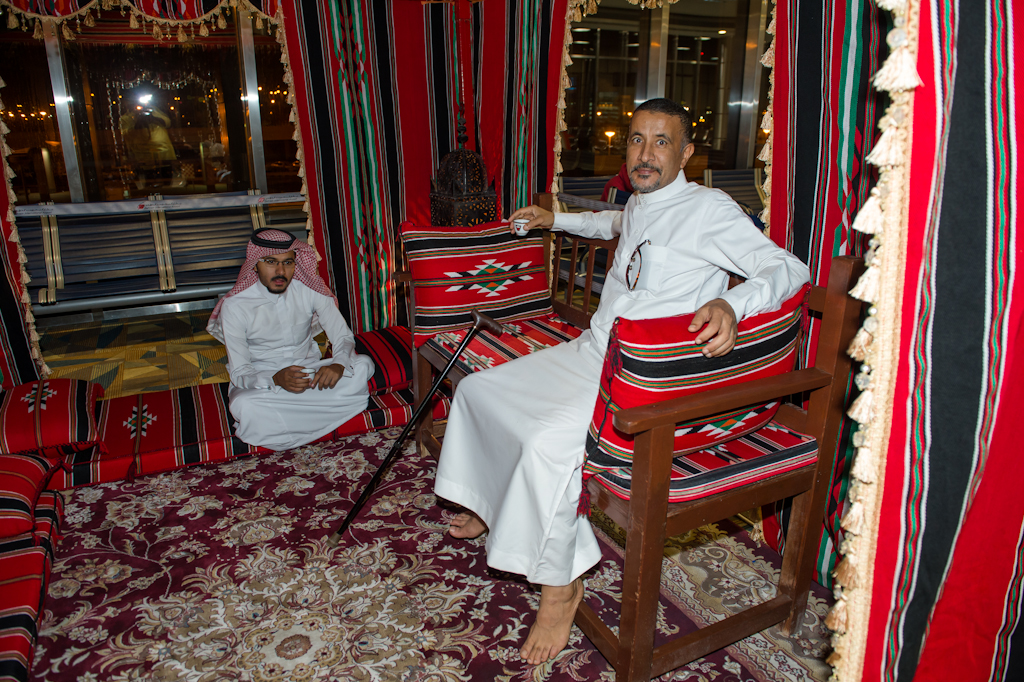
A small Ramadan tent inside Bahrain International Airport

In contrast to this materialism, some charitable organizations and individuals host free Ramadan tents that are open to strangers, especially the poor and those who otherwise have nowhere to go for Iftar. These charitable Ramadan tents are rarer than the lavish, commercial kind, although they can be found in countries with Muslim populations around the world. One such organization, the Ramadan Tent Project (RTP), hosts free Iftar dinners in open Ramadan tents that have served more than 50,000 people on four continents. These open Ramadan tents have been in operation since RTP was founded in 2011 by a graduate student at the School of Oriental and African Studies (SOAS) in London. The open Iftar dinners of the RTP are open to people of all faiths.

== History ==
Ramadan tents are a relatively recent tradition, and they do not date back to the origins of the holiday. Ramadan tents are believed to have their origin in Egyptian "saradek," tents set up in Cairo for people to offer their condolences. Over time, organizations and merchants began to use these saradek. Saradek became venues for providing food and shelter to the needy, particularly during the winter months. This marked the beginning of its transition to becoming the Ramadan tent that is well-known today. Soon, the saradek merged with the preexisting traditions of Arab hospitality and lavish Iftar dinners to create the modern Ramadan tent. However, Ramadan tents only became popular in the Levant following the end of the Lebanese Civil War in 1990, when they were introduced to Lebanon by a prominent businessman from the Tabbara family. Because Ramadan tents are a recent tradition, they are considered bid‘ah (Arabic: بدعة, innovation or heresy), by certain sects of Sunni Islam such as Salafism.
