= Date palm farming in India =

Date palm farming was started in 2007 in India. In India at present Rajasthan, Maharashtra, Tamil Nadu and Kerala, Gujarat these five states have started its production.

== Import ==
India imports 38% of world's production of Date palm. In 2019, India imported just about 282,580 metric tonnes of dates, with the most amount imported in the last two decades being 2016 with a little over 458,210 metric tonnes of dates being imported.

== Production ==
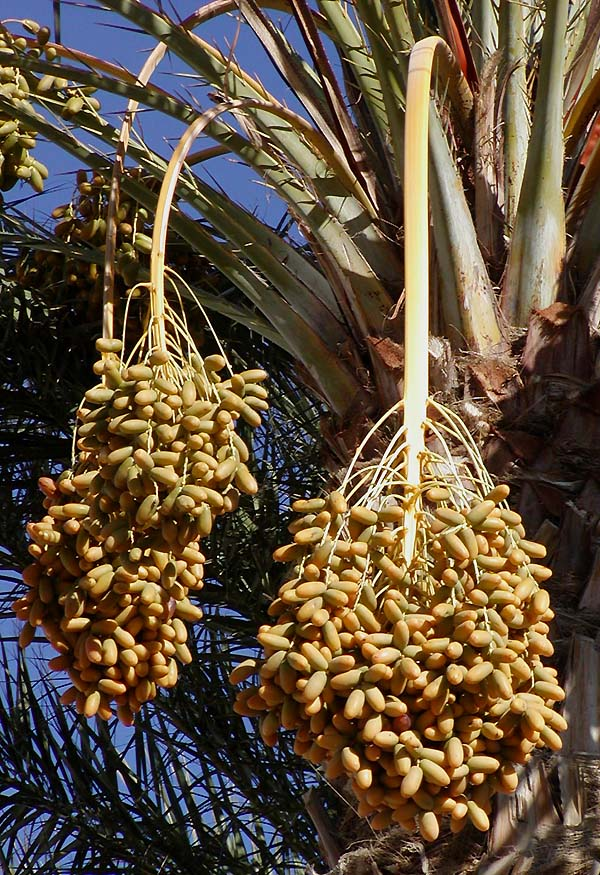
Dates growing on a date palm.

Kutch is the largest producer of date palm in India.

== Gujarat ==
Date palm in India occurs in the western border, especially in the Kutchh district of Gujarat with about 18286 ha. with a production of 171522 MT of fresh fruits. It was at initial stage in 2014. Among Rajasthan, Maharashtra, Tamil Nadu, and Kerala and other states Gujarat is the top producer. Gujarat state gives subsidy to its producers.

== Rajasthan ==
Date palm farming in Rajasthan was started in 2007. Rajasthan grows date palm varieties like Barhee, Khuneji, Khalas, Medjool, Khadravi, Jamli and Sagai. Rajasthan produced nearly 800 tonnes of date palm from the first harvest in 2015–16.

== See also ==
- Atul (company)

== See also ==
- Agriculture in India
