= Kesum =

Kesum, from Malay and Indonesian, is an edible and medicinal plant (the source of kesom oil) and may refer to:

- Persicaria minor, a.k.a. Polygonum minus
- Persicaria odorata, a.k.a. Polygonum odoratum
