= Ramadan bazaar =

Food market for Muslim month of fasting

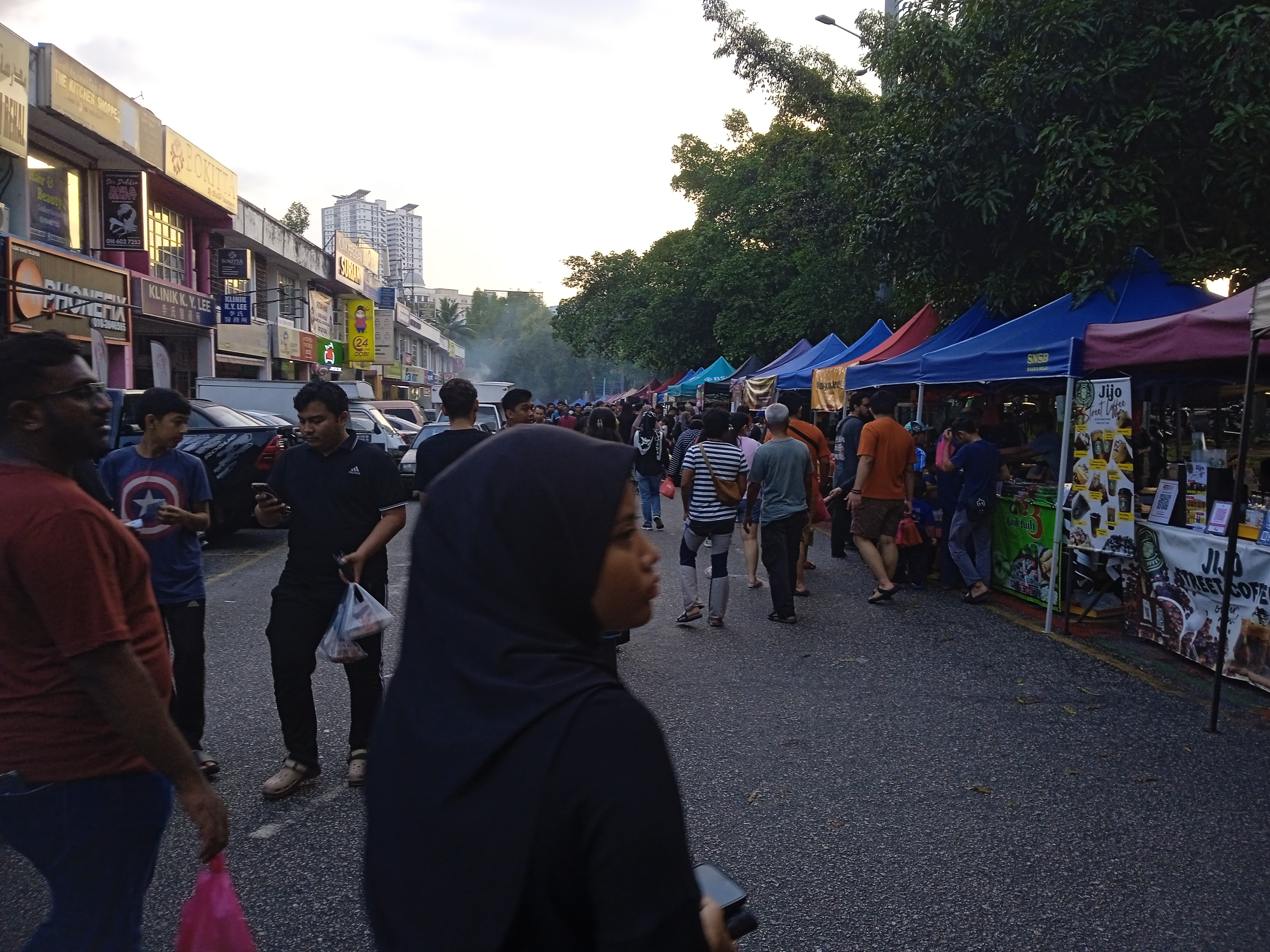
Hawkers at Ramadhan Bazaar

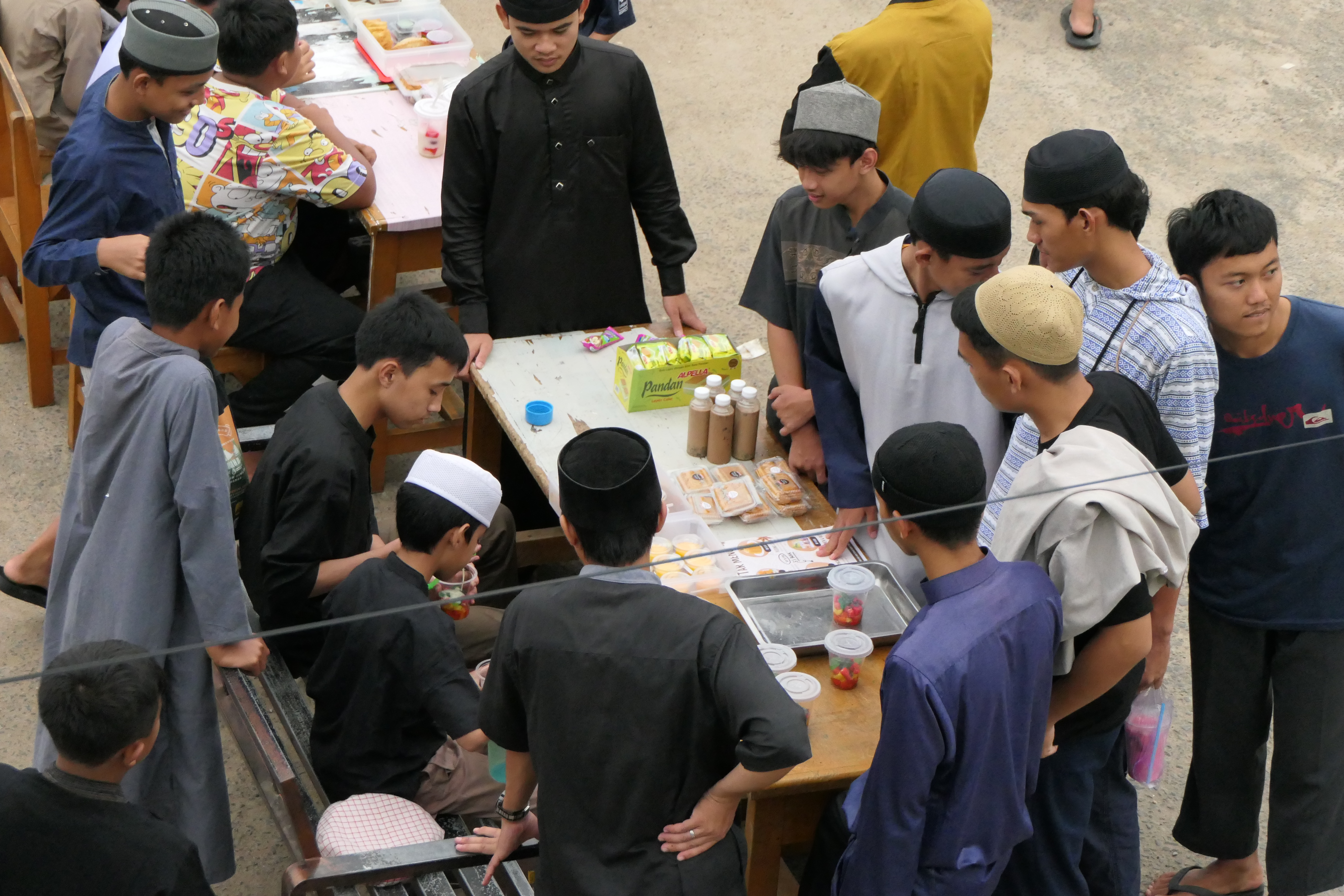
Bazar Ramadan that were held at SMP Uswatun Hasanah at Kota Jambi on 1446 H

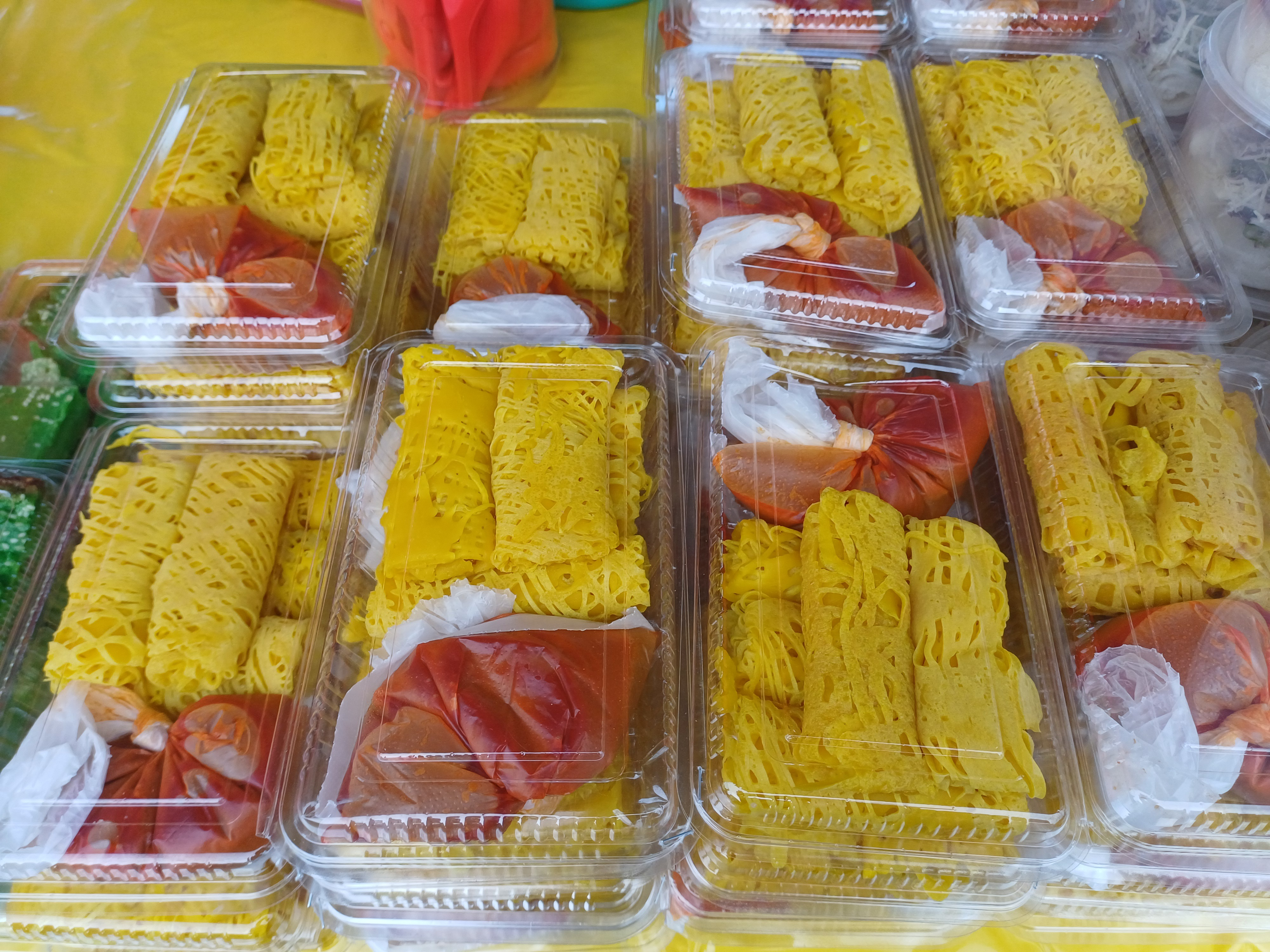
Some Kuih sold at Ramadhan Bazaar

Ramadan Bazaar or Ramadan stall refers to business activities by hawkers and restaurants in hotels selling a variety of modern and traditional dishes in an open area to break fast throughout the month of Ramadan in Malaysia, Brunei, and Singapore.

Culturally, these bazaars provide gathering places where religious and social celebrations mix. They are places where non-Muslims are welcome, despite their Islamic roots, making them important venues for cross-cultural exchange.

== Malaysia ==
Ramadan bazaars could be found in every district in Malaysia throughout the month of Ramadan, often at the site of the local pasar malam. Vendors start trading from 4 pm until the Maghrib call to prayer, which is the time to break fast. Various types of food are sold, from pastries to heavy meals, drinks and fruits. From traditional Malay delicacies like nasi lemak, laksa and rendang to exotic international fare like kabsa, biryani and baklava, the offerings at these bazaars cater to every palate and preference, locals and visitors alike.

Prominent bazaars include the ones at Masjid Jamek Kampung Baru, Kuala Lumpur, Taman Tun Dr Ismail (TTDI), Bukit Bintang, and Putrajaya. Meanwhile, the Ramadhan Bazaar in Klang is very famous for its various stalls selling murtabak and ayam percik.

Such events have been noted as a gastronomy tourism activity during the month of Ramadhan, as well as enriching entrepreneurial skills among vendors. It serves as an essential incubator for microbusinesses. Many stalls are operated by home-based cooks or small-scale vendors who utilise the month to supplement their annual income. Local municipal councils regulate these spaces through temporary licensing, ensuring a structured yet vibrant informal economy.

Post COVID-19, social media (especially TikTok and Instagram) acts as a primary driver for bazaar success. Vendors now design products specifically to go "viral," often prioritising visual appeal and "stunt" ingredients over traditional culinary heritage. This has created a digital-physical feedback loop where the longest queues are often determined by online hype rather than historical reputation.

== Singapore ==
In Singapore, the bazaar is more popularly at several location such as Kampong Glam, Geylang Serai and Marsiling. The bazaar would include hundreds of stalls and span several streets. There is also live performances and traditional activities showcase with Malay foods on offers were sold with contemporary twist. A more traditional bazaar will have foods such as lontong goreng and briyani.
