= Moreh (meal) =

Moreh (Malay pronunciation: [ˈmoˌrɛh], Jawi: موريه) is an informal supper tradition of Malaysian Muslims during the month of Ramadan taking place after mosque or surau congregants have done their tarawih prayers with light snacks and refreshments. Previously, food would be brought from home to be shared with the congregation as would a potluck; now, the snacks are prepared collectively by individuals or groups of people in the community.

Moreh can take place anywhere people can publicly gather and eat such as night markets, restaurants, and cafes both typical and artisan.

This tradition has also spread to Singapore.

== In popular culture ==
- Malaysian musician Monoloque made a song about this tradition in 2014.
