= Soft Khichuri =

Rice dish associated with Ramadan

Sylheti Smooth Porridge
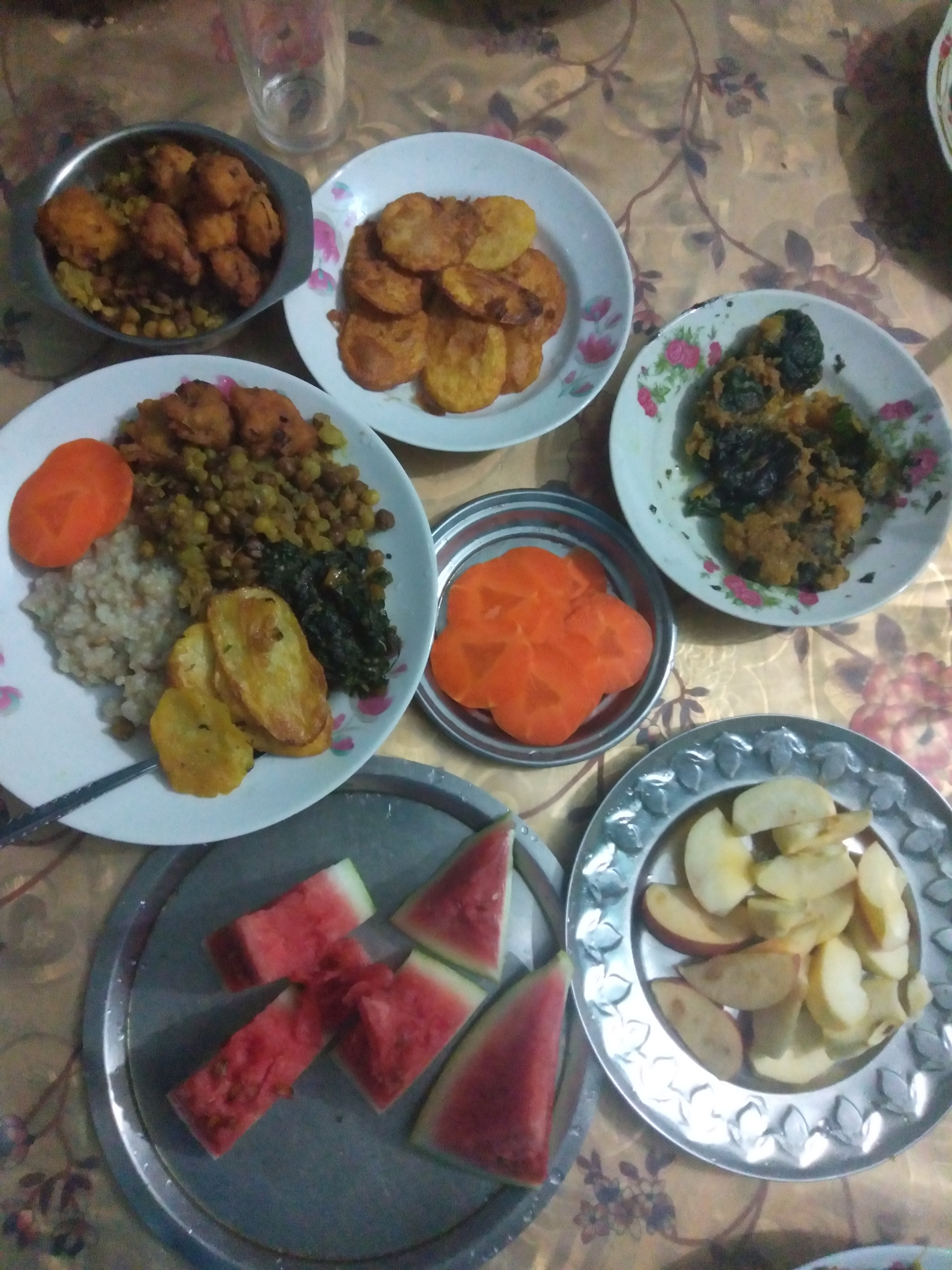
- traditional Sylheti iftari with Kisuri
- Alternative names: Leța Kisuri
- Course: Main
- Place of origin: Bangladesh
- Region or state: Sylhet
- Main ingredients: rice fenugreek seed onions , dal

Smooth Porridge, also known as Patla Khichuri, Norom Khichuri or, Leța Kisuri, is one kind of rice-based meal which is similar in consistency to porridge, a popular dish in the Sylhet region of Bangladesh. It is a traditional food in Sylheti cuisine that is served most dinner tables during the holy month of Ramadan. Being a staple food for iftar, Soft Khichuri at home and Akhni for serving the guest is a tradition of Sylhet. Aromatic rice mixing with various spices including ghee, kalozira and fenugreek to cook Kisuri.

== Ingredients ==
Rice,, onions, ginger optional, a little amount of ghee or butter, fenugreek and salt vegetable kichuri add vegetable, lentil kichuri add lentils.

== See also ==
- Cuisine of Bangladesh
- White House Iftar dinner
