= Furir Bari Iftari =

Sylheti Bengali Ramadan tradition

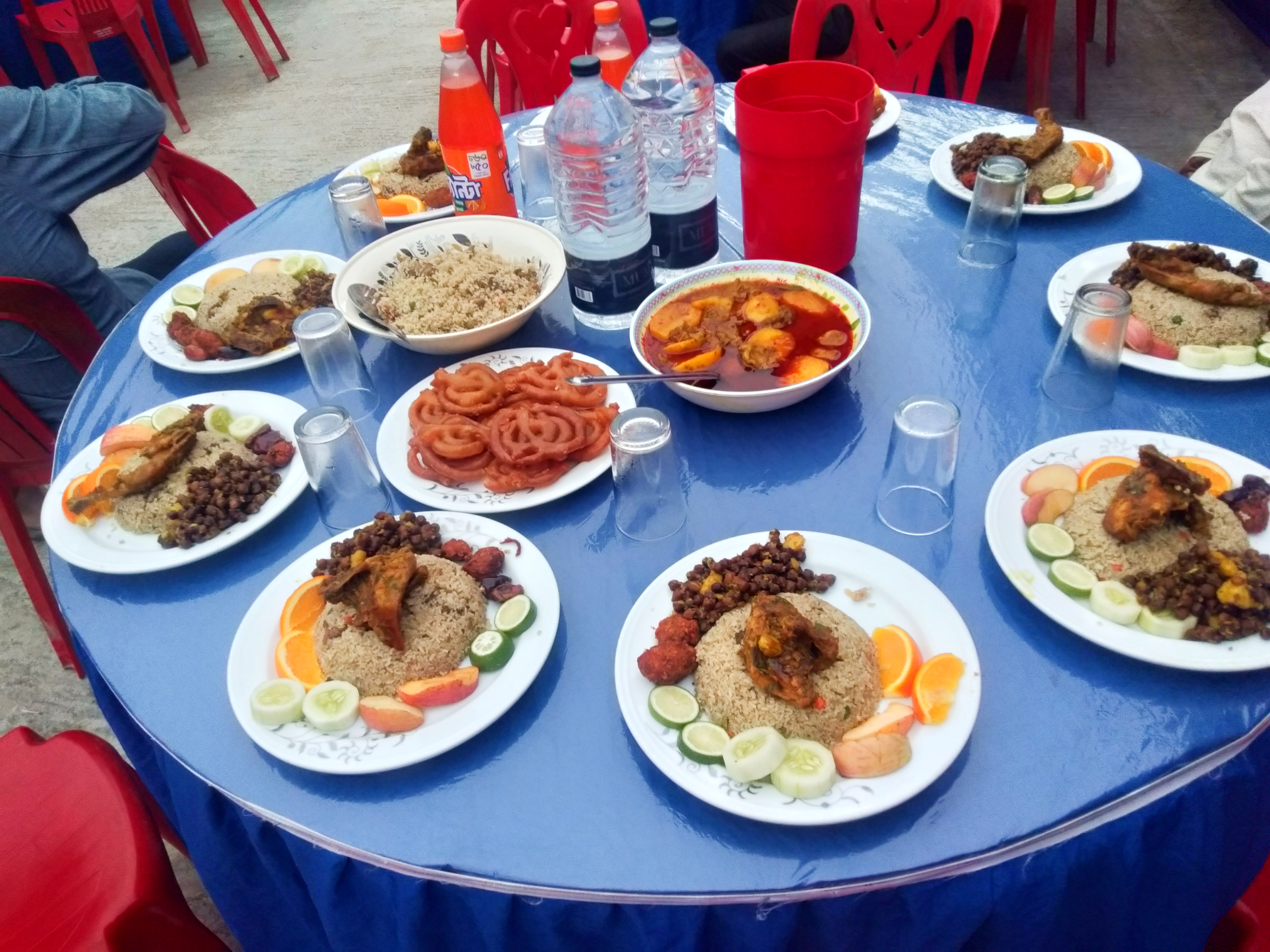
Furir Barir istari Celebration in Sylhet

Furir Bari Istari is the Sylheti tradition among Muslims in the Sylhet region of giving Iftar (the fast-breaking evening meal) to the household of one's daughter's in-laws during the month of Ramadan. The term comes from the Sylheti word Furi (daughter).

The practice is not obligatory in Islam, but in-laws have come to expect it. There have been incidents where a daughter's husband and in-laws have allegedly tortured her, driven her to suicide, or killed her, if her father has not given generously to them.

Some commentators have criticized the custom as a superstition or an evil practice because it can be a mental, financial and social burden on a father who is poor. In 2023 UNESCO added the iftar tradition of muslims to its list of Intangible Cultural Heritage.

== See also ==
- Bangladeshi cuisine
- Bengali cuisine
- Iftar
- Eid cuisine
- Ramadan
- Bengali culture
- Culture of Bangladesh
- White House Iftar dinner
