= Iftar party =

Gathering during Ramadan

Iftar Party
- Genre: Religious, social, cultural
- Date: Ramadan (Evenings)
- Frequency: Annual
- Location: Global
- Participants: Family, friends, communities, political leaders

An Iftar party (also known as Dawat-e-Iftar) is a gathering that occurs during the Islamic holy month of Ramadan, where guests come together to break their fast at sunset. These events are traditionally celebrated with family and friends but have evolved into more elaborate social and political gatherings across various cultures. Iftar parties expand this practice into communal events, emphasizing charity, social bonding, and interfaith dialogue. Individuals, organizations, or governments can host these gatherings, varying in scale and purpose.

== History and origin ==
The tradition of breaking the fast collectively has been part of Islamic culture since the early days of Islam. However, hosting formal iftar parties as we know them today began gaining prominence in the 20th century, particularly when political leaders started organizing such events to foster unity and goodwill among diverse communities.

== Family and friends ==
Family-friendly iftar events are organized at restaurants and cultural centers. Family iftar parties are intimate gatherings where relatives come together to break their fast. These events often feature traditional dishes, such as dates, lentil soup, and regional specialties.

Iftar parties among friends are popular for their festive and relaxed atmosphere. These gatherings often include a mix of traditional and modern dishes, outings, and shared prayers.

In some cultures in Indonesia, bukber (Indonesian: buka bersama, lit. 'breaking the fast together') is common for families. The event gathers families, friends, sometimes neighbors to commemorate iftar at home, or buffets at hotels. Some mosques also host these events.

== Social ==
Iftar parties extend to larger social circles, including community centers, mosques, and charitable organizations. Like Saudi Arabia’s Global Iftar Program which provides meals to over 1 million people across 61 countries through embassies and Islamic centers. Similarly the Custodian of the Two Holy Mosques Program serve iftar to the thousands of people in the Masjid al-Haram and Prophet's Mosque.

== Political ==
Political iftar parties are hosted by leaders and parties as a gesture of goodwill and outreach to the Muslim community across the globe. These events are often attended by influential figures, including politicians, religious leaders, and celebrities. While they aim to foster communal harmony, they are sometimes criticized for being symbolic rather than impactful.

=== Australia ===
In Australia, various institutions like Deakin University and the University of Melbourne regularly organize iftar programs, emphasizing education and cultural exchange. on 20 March 2025 The Australian Jordanian Community Association (AJCA) held a Ramadan Iftar Dinner.

=== Bangladesh ===
In Bangladesh, the concept of political iftar parties gained momentum under General Hussain Muhammad Ershad’s regime in the 1980s. He utilized religion in politics through organized iftars aimed at consolidating support and reinforcing his leadership.

=== India ===
In India, political iftar parties became an integral part of diplomatic engagement starting from the era of Jawaharlal Nehru, who used these occasions to strengthen communal harmony. Indira Gandhi further popularized this practice by giving it a "political color," using these lavish events strategically to reach out to different sections of society.

=== United Kingdom ===
On 4 March 2025, the House of Commons hosted its first-ever iftar party, called "The Big Iftar," Organized by the All-Party Parliamentary Group on British Muslims, the event was attended by Prime Minister Keir Starmer.

=== United States ===
In the United States, iftar parties have also become significant political events as The White House hosts annual iftar dinners In 2025, several members of the American Congress attended an iftar party organized by the Muslim World League (MWL) at the US Congress in Washington.

== Others ==
=== Bollywood/Baba Siddique ===
One of the iftar parties was that of Baba Siddique, a prominent NCP leader and former Maharashtra minister. Known for his deep connections in Bollywood, Siddique hosted annual star-studded iftar galas that became a highlight. His events attracted some of the biggest names in the Indian film industry, including actors like Salman Khan, Shah Rukh Khan, and Sanjay Dutt, as well as filmmakers and designers such as Kabir Khan and Manish Malhotra.
