= Chawkbazar Iftar Market =

Seasonal Ramadan food market in Dhaka, Bangladesh

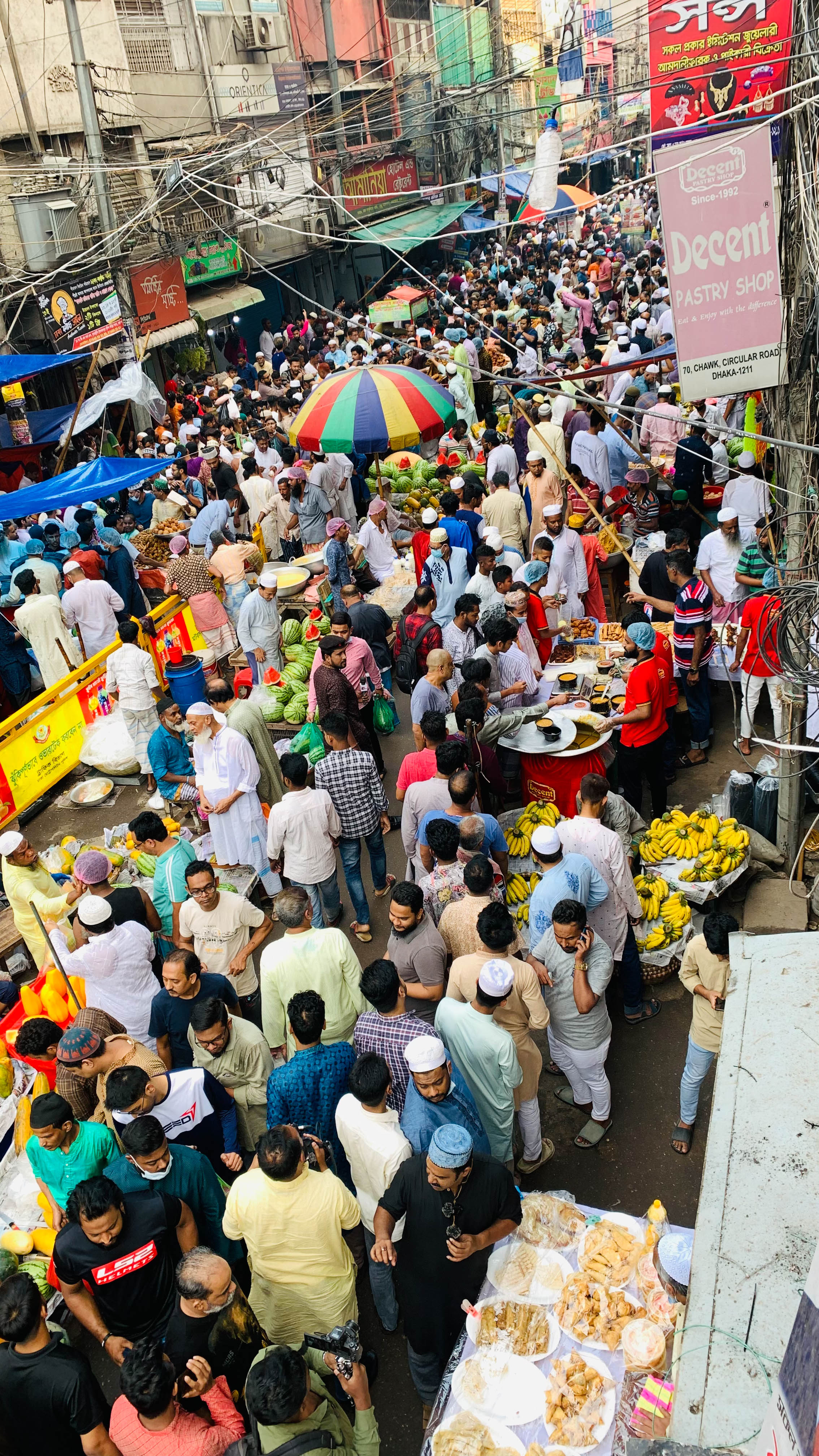
Chawkbazar Iftar Market

Chawkbazar Iftar Market is a seasonal Ramadan food market held annually in the Chawkbazar area of Old Dhaka, Bangladesh. The market opens during the month of Ramadan, when hundreds of temporary stalls sell traditional foods prepared for iftar, the evening meal that breaks the daily fast. This is one of the oldest and most prominent Ramadan food markets in Bangladesh, and often gets crowded.

The market is situated near the Chawkbazar Shahi Mosque, which attracts food enthusiasts during Ramadan. People from various parts of the city visit here to purchase a wide range of traditional foods.

== History ==
During the Mughal period, Chawkbazar developed into one of the main commercial centres of Dhaka. The nearby Shahi Mosque was built in 1676 during the reign of Mughal governor Shaista Khan, and the area around it later became an important market.

In 1702, Mughal administrator Murshid Quli Khan reorganized the area into a formal market, making Chawkbazar a major commercial centre of the city.

Historical accounts show that vendors began selling food prepared for the Ramadan evening meal around the mosque, which gradually evolved into the modern Chawkbazar Iftar Bazaar. This tradition has been going on for centuries and is considered a major cultural event during the holy month.

== Accounts in historical literature ==
Several historians discuss the importance of Chawkbazar in the social and commercial life of Old Dhaka. In his book Glimpses of Old Dhaka, historian Syed Muhammed Taifoor depicts the market as a lively social gathering place. Scholars, traders, and residents used to gather here for chat and business.

In addition to Taifur's work, Hakim Habibur Rahman's book Dhaka: Panchas Baras Pahle records the cultural life and food traditions of Dhaka in the late 19th and early 20th centuries. Among its topics are the Ramadan food markets and street vendors in the Chawkbazar area.

Moreover, urban historians such as Ahmad Hasan Dani and Sharif Uddin Ahmed have identified Chawkbazar as a major Mughal-era market that played a central role in Dhaka's commercial development.

== Ramadan market ==
During Ramadan, from the afternoon to Iftar time, the streets around Chawkbazar turn into an open-air food market. Hundreds of temporary stalls line the streets and alleys near the mosques, selling a variety of traditional foods.

This atmosphere attracts thousands of visitors from across Dhaka every year, making it one of the city's busiest places during Ramadan.

Some families have been running shops in this market for generations, preserving Old Dhaka's culinary heritage.

== Cuisine ==
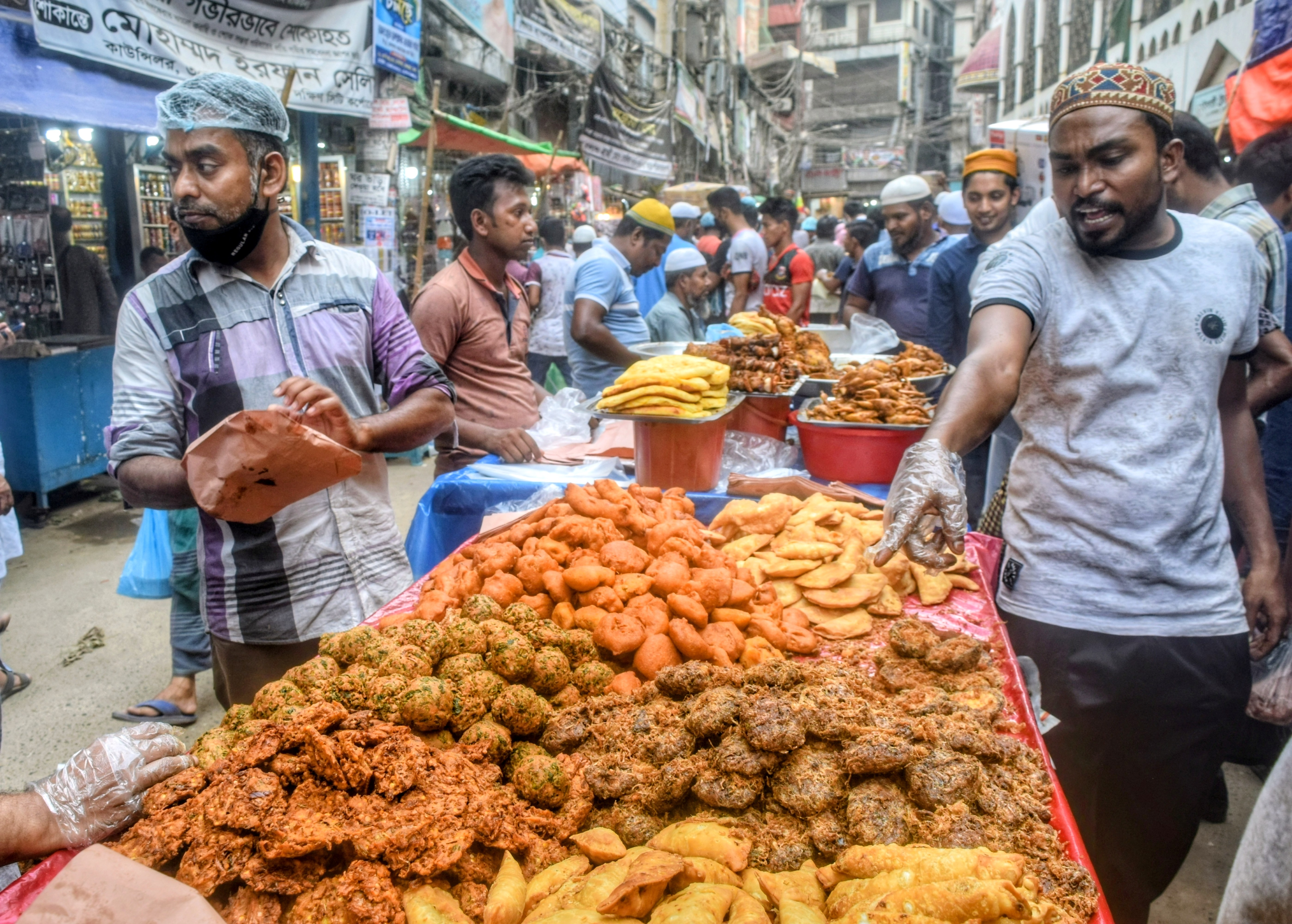
Typical Iftar items from Chawkbazar

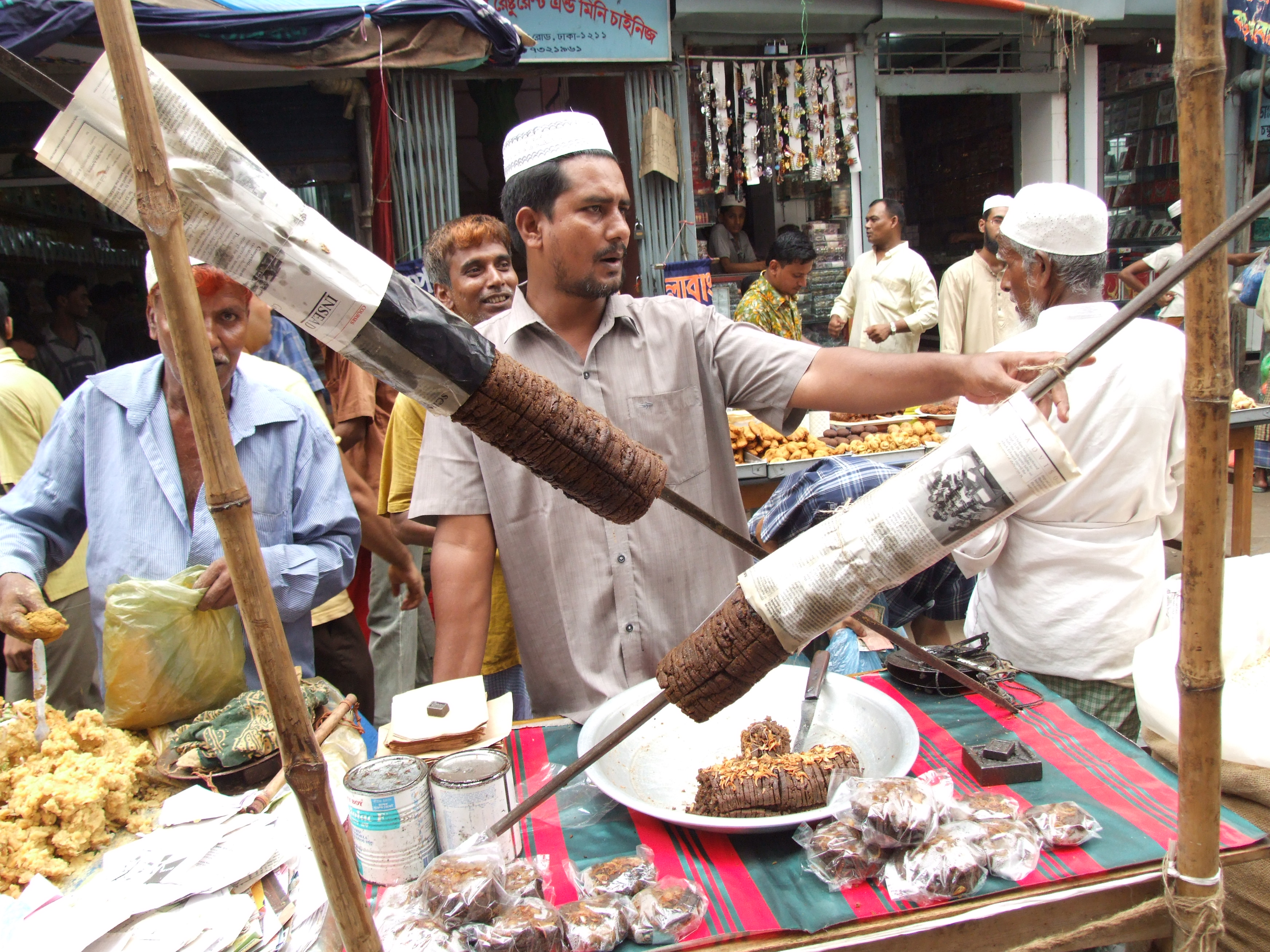
A kebab seller from Chawkbazar

Known for its variety of traditional dishes, many influenced by Mughal cuisine, Chawkbazar Iftar Market fills with hundreds of items during Ramadan. These include various kebabs, roasted meats, sweets, and fried snacks.

One of the famous dishes at this market is Boro Baper Polay Khay, a rich mixture of chickpeas, minced meat, eggs, spices, and ghee.

Other popular dishes include Suti Kebab, Tikka Kebab, and Whole Lamb Roast, Haleem, Phirni, Jilapi, and various traditional Ramadan drinks.

== Criticism and safety concerns ==
The Chawkbazar Iftar Market has repeatedly faced concerns about food hygiene, safety, and quality. Authorities and consumer rights groups have identified problems such as improper food handling, lack of sanitation, and the sale of contaminated or spoiled food during Ramadan.

A scientific study has examined the quality of street iftar food sold in the Chawkbazar area. A microbiological study analyzing street food and beverage samples from multiple categories collected at the market found high levels of bacterial contamination, indicating a potential public health risk associated with consumption.

Government agencies, such as the Bangladesh Food Safety Authority, have conducted monitoring campaigns in Ramadan markets, including Chawkbazar, to promote safe food handling practices and raise public awareness of hygiene standards.

Additionally, health experts have also warned that fried and processed foods sold in open environments can pose a risk of foodborne illness and chronic health problems if not handled in accordance with hygiene standards.

Despite these concerns, the market continues to attract a large number of visitors each year, and vendors often claim to follow traditional preparation methods and hygiene standards when serving customers.

== Cultural heritage context ==
In 2023, UNESCO added iftar to its Intangible Cultural Heritage List, recognizing its role in maintaining communal meals and social connections.

The Chawkbazar Iftar Market brings these traditions to life on a local scale.

Researchers have also noted the role of Ramadan food markets in sustaining informal economies and preserving culinary traditions in urban Bangladesh.

== See also ==
- Ramadan
- Iftar
- Cuisine of Bangladesh
- Old Dhaka
