= Takjil =

Food or drink that breaks fasts in Indonesia

Takjil is a light breaksfast food or drink in Indonesia. While Takjil encompasses anything eaten for breakfast, it is generally understood within the context of Ramadan, because the term only appears during Ramadan. In some parts of the country, Takjil were distributed by government bodies

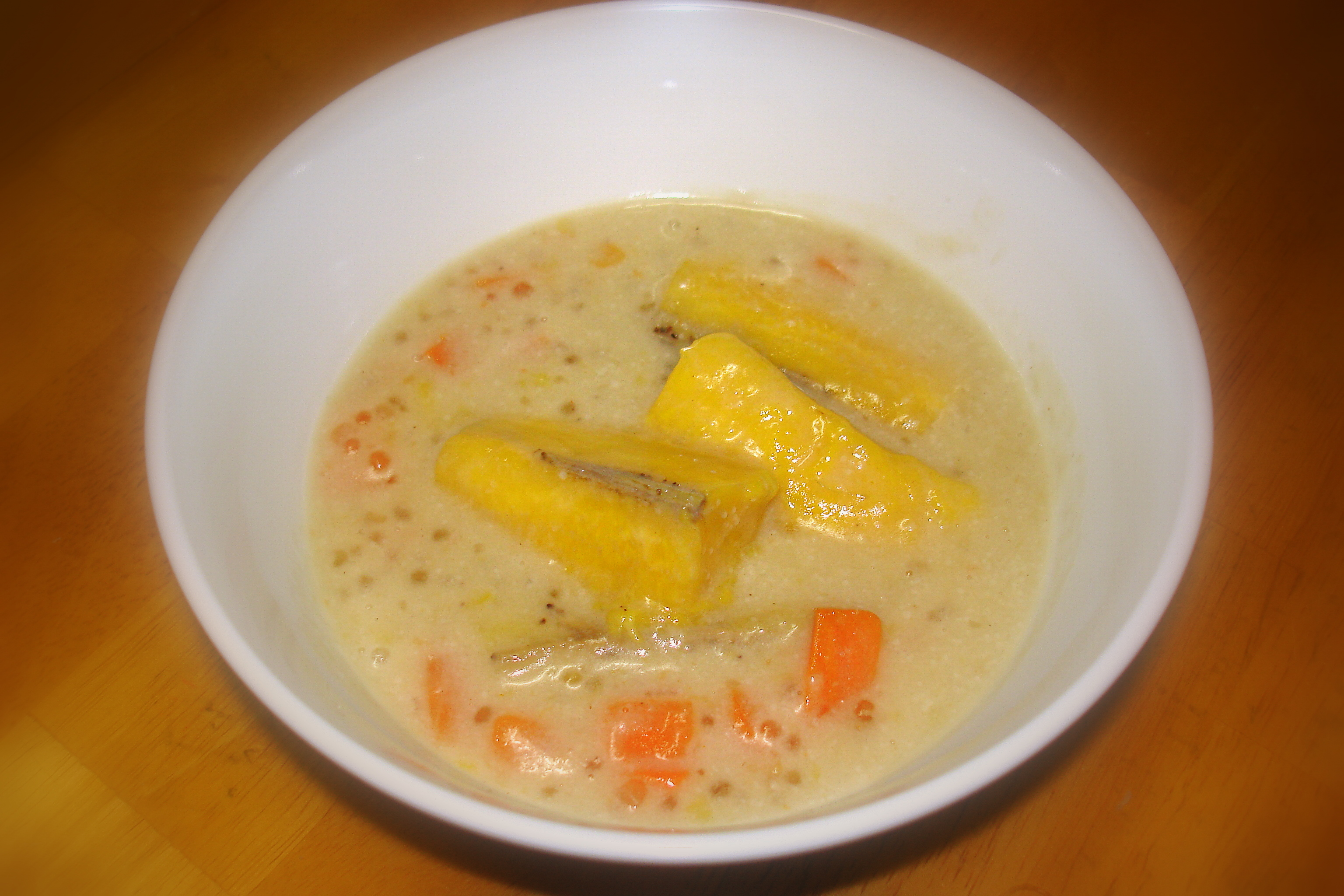
Kolak, one of Takjil food.

Takjil food are sweets such as kolak pisang, fruit soup, es campur, and others.

== Etymology ==
The first mention of takjil appears in Snouck Hurgronje's account of his visit to Aceh in 1891–1892, "De Atjehers." The account explains that the Acehnese had prepared a fast-breaking meal (takjil) in the mosque for the community, consisting of ie bu peudah, or spicy porridge.

Inside Kamus Besar Bahasa Indonesia, takjil means haste in breaking the fast. It originated from the Arabic term 'ajila, which means hasten before it absorbed its meaning of haste in breaking the fast. In Minang, takjil is also known as pabukoan. The tradition of delivering takjil from a daughter-in-law to her father-in-law is called maanta pabukoan.

In certain contexts, takjil can have the same meaning as iftar. Although both originate from Arabic, iftar literally means "breaking the fast" or the moment of breaking the fast, without necessarily meaning hastening. Therefore, iftar encompasses the entire process of breaking the fast, including the main meal (heavy meal) after takjil, even after the Maghrib prayer. Thus, takjil is part of the iftar sequence.

== Takjil War ==
Takjil War is the act of rushing to buy sweets for breaking iftar. Patrons fight over fast-breaking snacks.

The markets open from 3 PM till iftar time with hundreds of small scale vendors selling snacks and street foods, such as fried foods, dim sum, milk satay, and cold drinks. During this interval, seasonal snacks and drinks are available for purchase.

Takjil buyers aren't limited to Muslims or Indonesian citizens. Foreign tourists compete for the foods and sweets consumer. In many places, non-Muslims and foreigners enjoy this tradition.

== See also ==
- Iftar
- Fasting during Ramadan
- Eid al-Fitr
