= Ie bu peudah =

Ie bu peudah بوبور لمبوق
- Course: Main
- Place of origin: Indonesia
- Region or state: Aceh Besar
- Created by: Acehnese
- Serving temperature: Hot
- Main ingredients: Rice, mung bean, corn and various spices

Ie bu peudah, or spicy porridge, is a typical Aceh porridge dish with a soft texture and a slightly spicy yet sweet and salty flavor, along with a unique aroma. It is made from various grains such as rice, mung bean, and corn, along with various spices that enhance its flavor and uniqueness, such as tahe peuha leaves, nekuet leaves, teumpheung leaves, and saga leaves. Ie bu peudah is often made during Ramadan (as part of takjil) and certain traditional events.

== Ingridients ==
Ie bu peudah is a dish made from 44 types of forest leaves. It is cooked with a mixture of pepper, turmeric, galangal, and garlic. Rice and coconut grated are then added to the spice mixture giving mildl spiciness of the seasonings. The taste of i.e. bu peudah is similar to porridge kanji rumbi or chicken porridge. However, it has a distinct spiciness to it. It also use as remedy for cold.

== Tradition ==
Cooking the dish i.e. bu peudah or spicy rice porridge is one of the moments to strengthen ties in the community, especially during the month of Ramadan, such as in one of the villages in Aceh, namely in Bueng Bak Jok, Kuta Baro district, Aceh Besar Regency, which still continues the tradition of cooking i.e. bu peudah through mutual cooperation.

They work together in collecting tools and ingredients, mixing spices, cooking until it is distributed to the community. Different groups in the village have different traditional roles when cooking the dish. Men are in charge of collecting various ingredients, spices and leaves needed, as many as 44 types, while the women mix the spices and ingredients. They pound the mix with the jeungki, a traditional Acehnese pestle, until it can be cooked by the village youth in a large pot in the meunasah. Children help prepare containers to make it easier for the porridge to be shared and taken home by residents.

The community will start to cook it at noon with the rice cooked in a giant pan while the cook stir it continuously to maintain the heat distributed evenly. The cooking process will took roughly two hours before them being served to the communities.
