= Kolak (food) =

Indonesian dessert

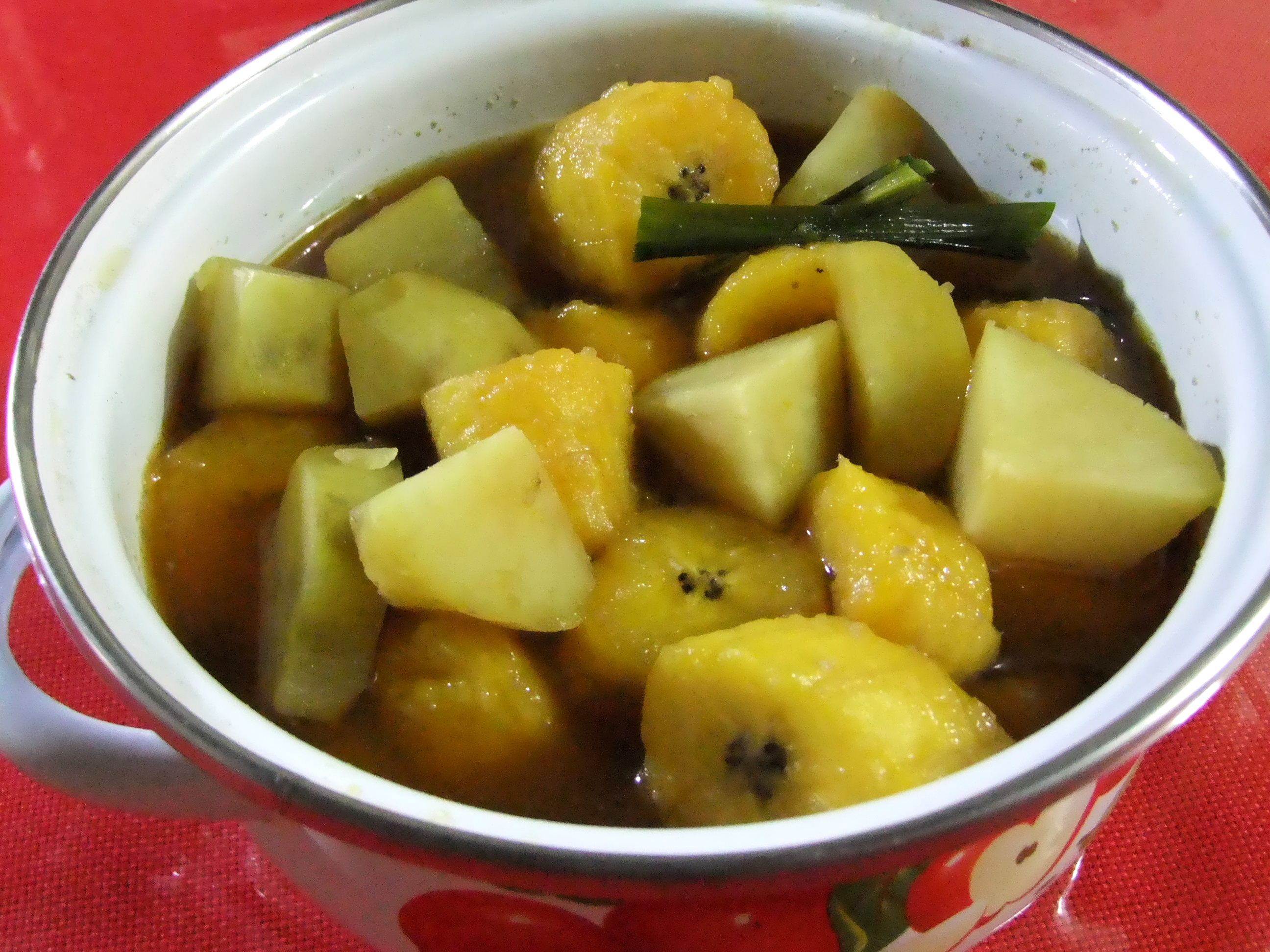
- A pot of banana and sweet potato kolak
- Alternative names: Kolek
- Course: Dessert
- Place of origin: Indonesia
- Region or state: Southeast Asia
- Created by: Indonesians
- Main ingredients: Palm sugar, coconut milk, pandanus leaf
- Variations: Kolak pisang, Kolak pisang ubi, Kolak waluh, Kolak biji salak, Kolak nangka, Kolak ubi, Kolak durian

Kolak (or kolek) is an Indonesian sweet dessert based on palm sugar or coconut sugar, coconut milk, and pandanus leaf (P. amaryllifolius). A variation in which banana is added, is called kolak pisang or banana kolak. Other variations may add ingredients such as pumpkins, sweet potatoes, jackfruit, plantains, cassava, rice balls, tapioca pearls, and kolang-kaling (aren palm fruit). It is usually served warm or at room temperature, but some prefer it cold.

In Indonesia, kolak is a popular iftar dish, locally known as takjil (sugary snacks and drinks consumed to break the fast) during the holy month of Ramadan, and is also a popular street food.

== Preparation ==
Kolak is basically a dessert based on a sweet liquid made from the mixture of palm sugar and coconut milk. Blocks of palm sugar are crushed and liquified in boiling water, mixed together with coconut milk and pandanus leaf to add aroma. Additional fillings are added and boiled together in this hot sweet liquid. Popular kolak contents including sliced banana, diced sweet potato, ground sweet potato balls, diced pumpkin, jackfruit, and aren palm fruit locally known as kolang-kaling.

Traditionally kolak served warm right after it was cooked and ready, or at room temperature. However, some variant might add ice cubes as sweet cold dessert according to individual preferences.

== Variants ==
These are variants of kolak. Sometimes a combo is presented in a serving, for example kolak pisang that contains slices of banana is often combined with diced sweet potato and kolang-kaling sugar palm fruit. Some recipes might add tapioca pearls.

1. Kolak biji salak: ground sweet potato balls kolak
2. Kolak ketan durian: durian kolak with sticky rice
3. Kolak kolang-kaling: sugar palm fruit kolak
4. Kolak nangka: jackfruit kolak
5. Kolak pisang: banana kolak
6. Kolak radio: A Serang kolak made of banana, pineapple, kolang-kaling and rose apple but without coconut milk.
7. Kolak singkong: cassava kolak
8. Kolak setup pisang: banana kolak without coconut milk but added cinnamon, pandanus leaf, and cloves.
9. Kolak ubi: diced sweet potato kolak
10. Kolak waluh/labu: pumpkin kolak

== Gallery ==
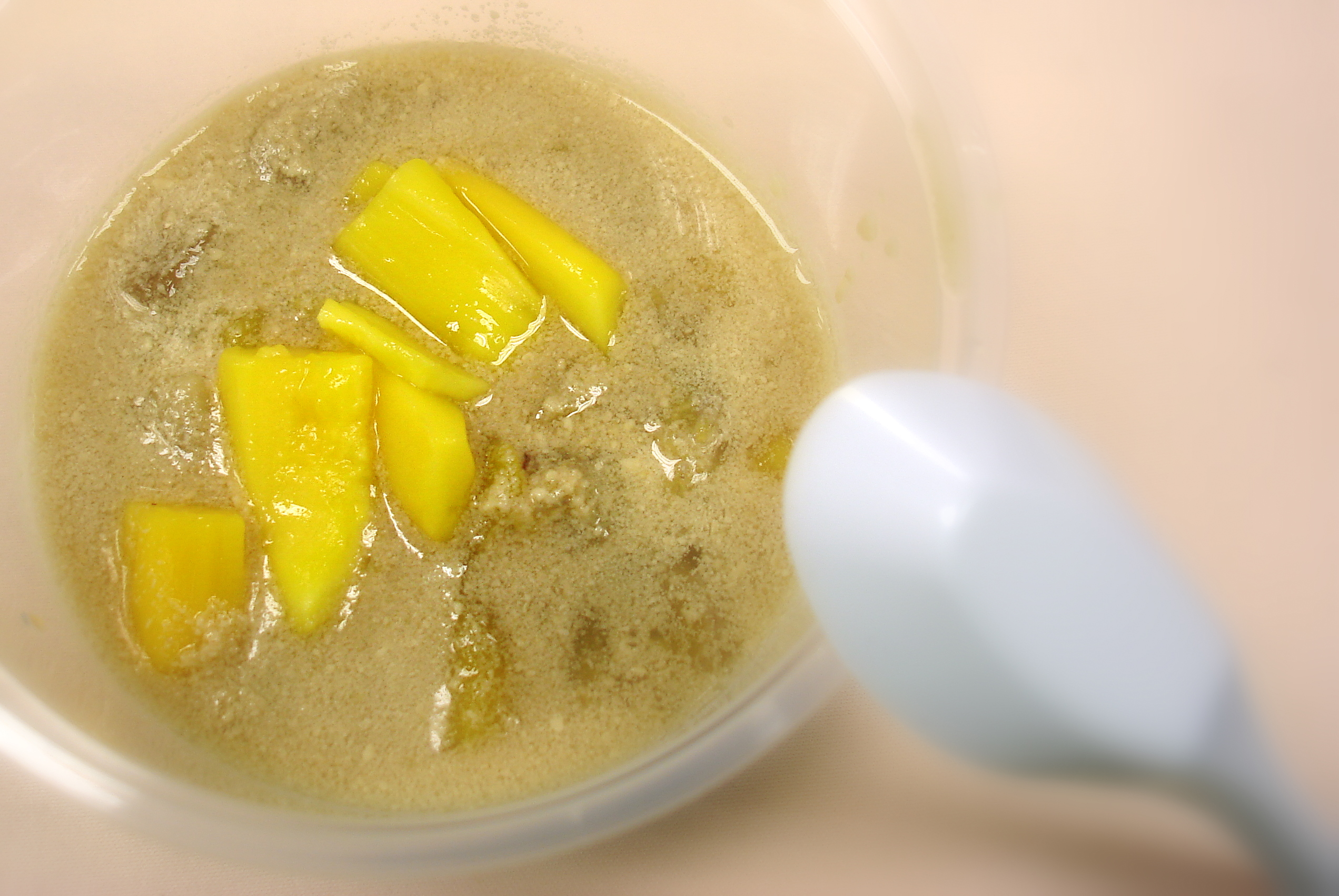
A bowl of jackfruit kolak

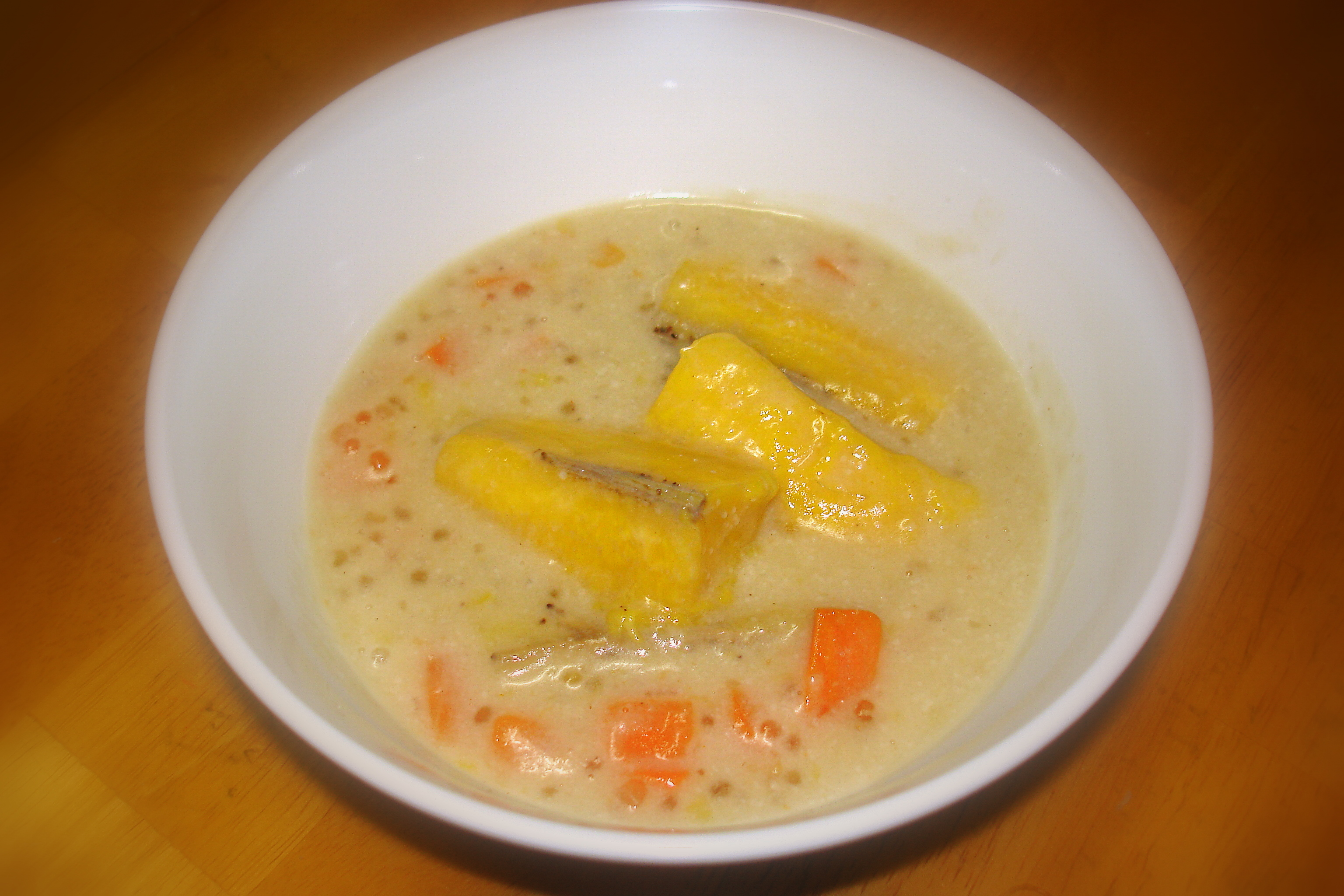
Banana kolak, a variant of kolak.

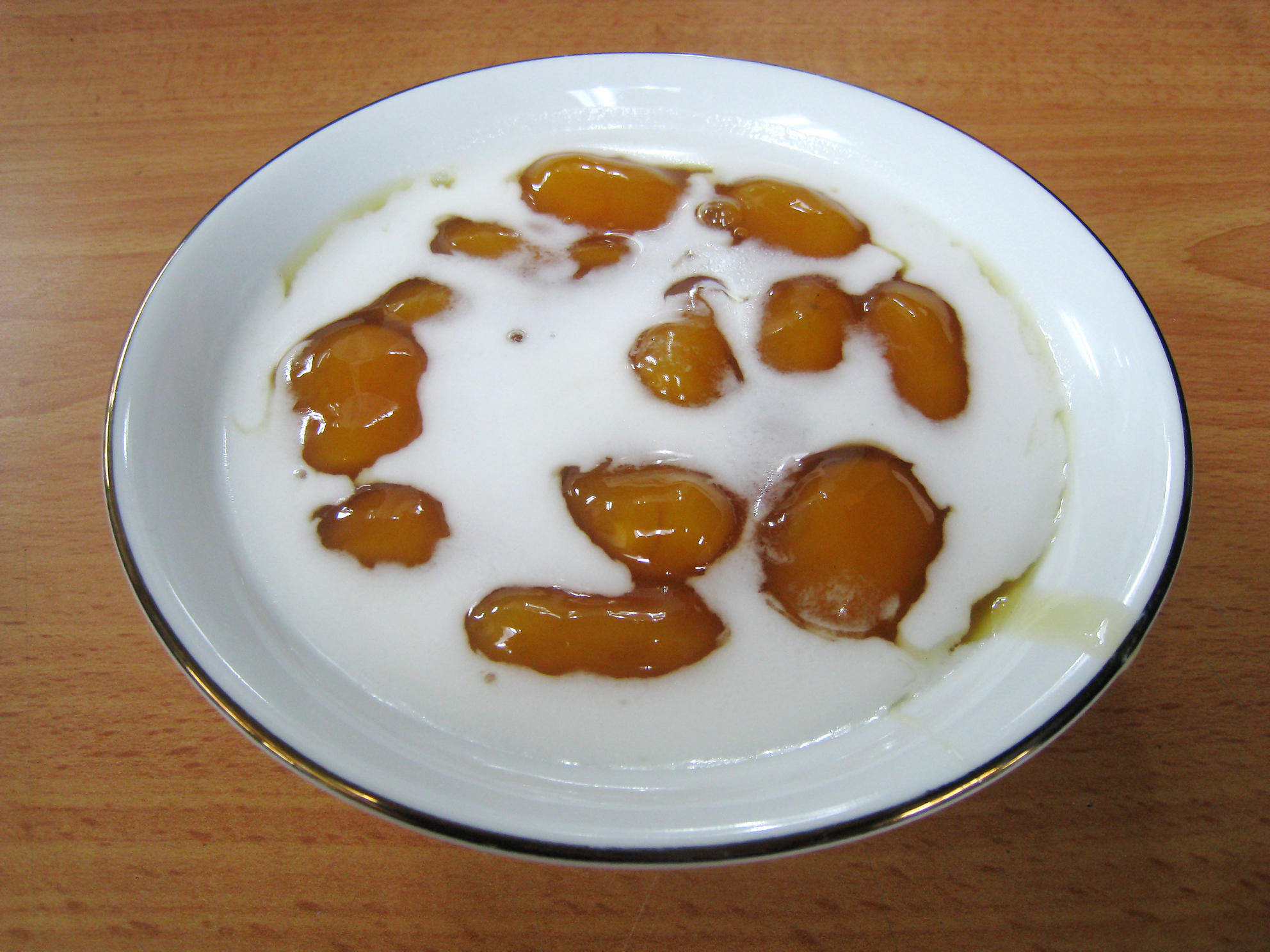
Kolak biji salak, made from sweet potato balls.

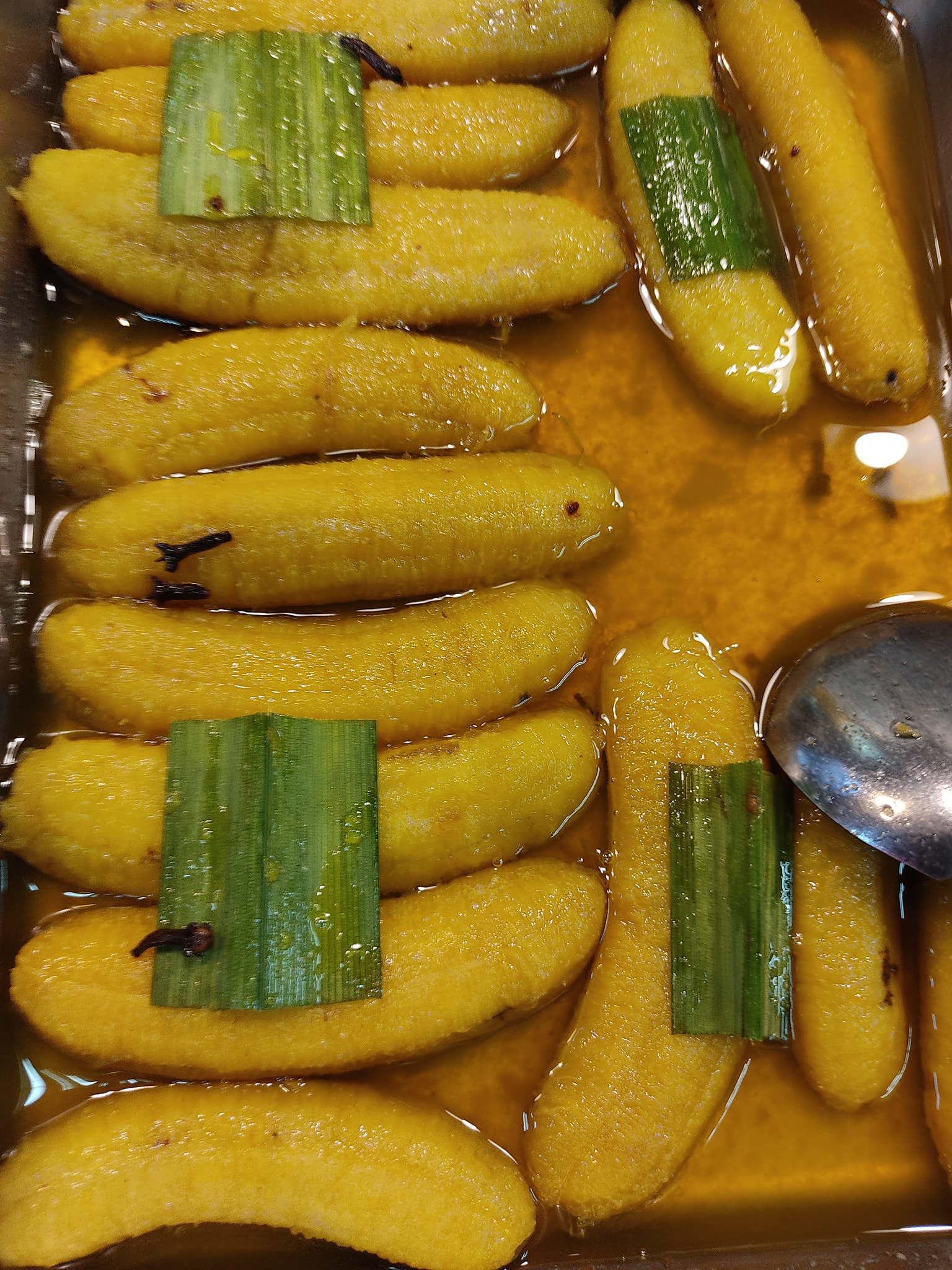
Kolak setup pisang

== See also ==
- Binignit, a similar dish from the Philippines
