= Beguni =

Bengal region brinjal dish

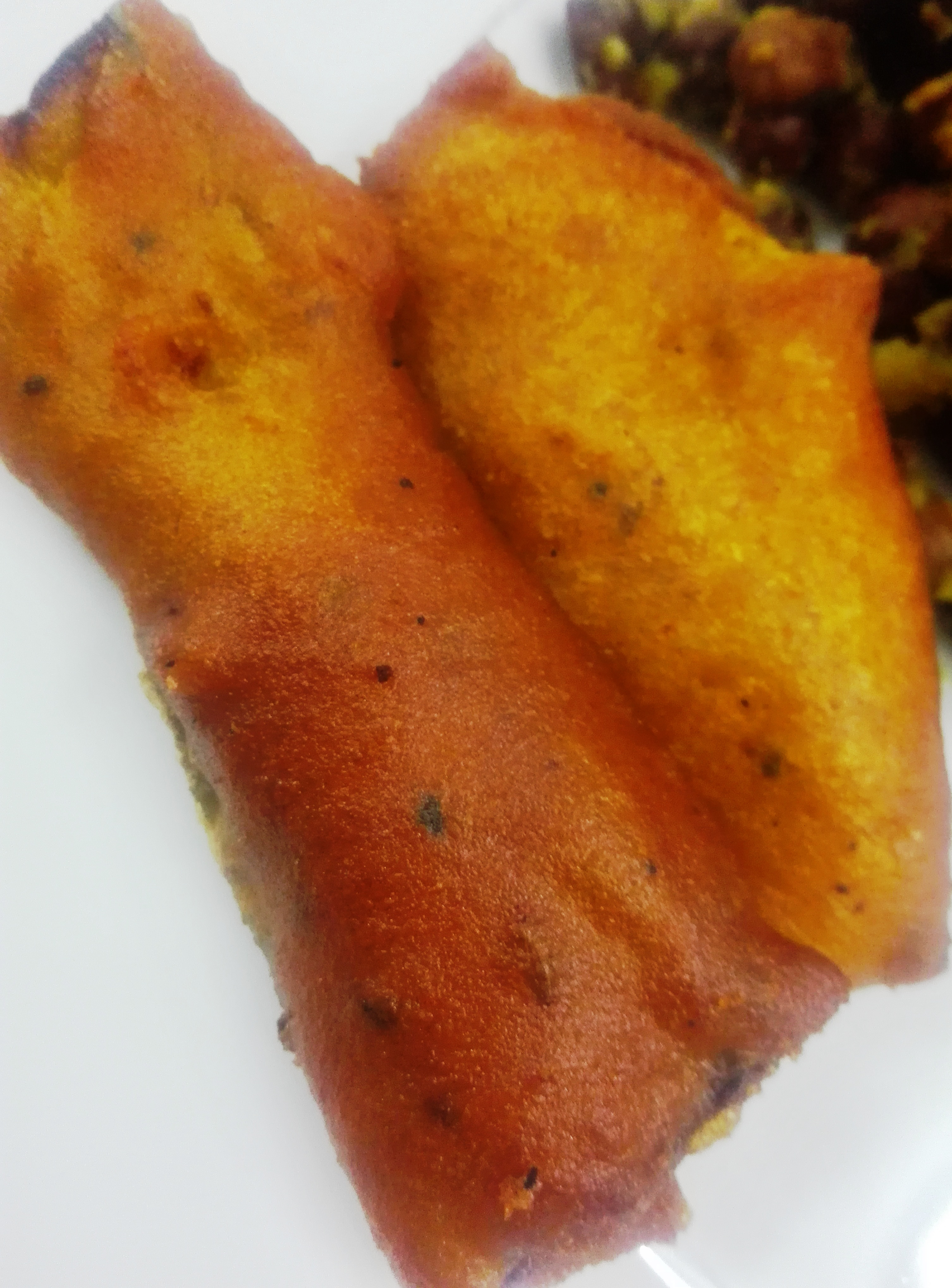
- Beguni
- Course: Snack
- Place of origin: India, Bangladesh
- Region or state: Bengal
- Associated cuisine: Bangladesh, India
- Main ingredients: Brinjal (eggplant), gram flour, salt, vegetable oil

Beguni (Bengali: বেগুনী) is a common Bengali snack. It is made of eggplant (also known as aubergine or brinjal) which is sliced and dipped in gram flour batter before being either fried or deep fried in oil. This dish is popular in Bangladesh, specifically during Ramadan, and the eastern Indian states of West Bengal, Assam and Tripura. A similar European dish is known as aubergine fritters.

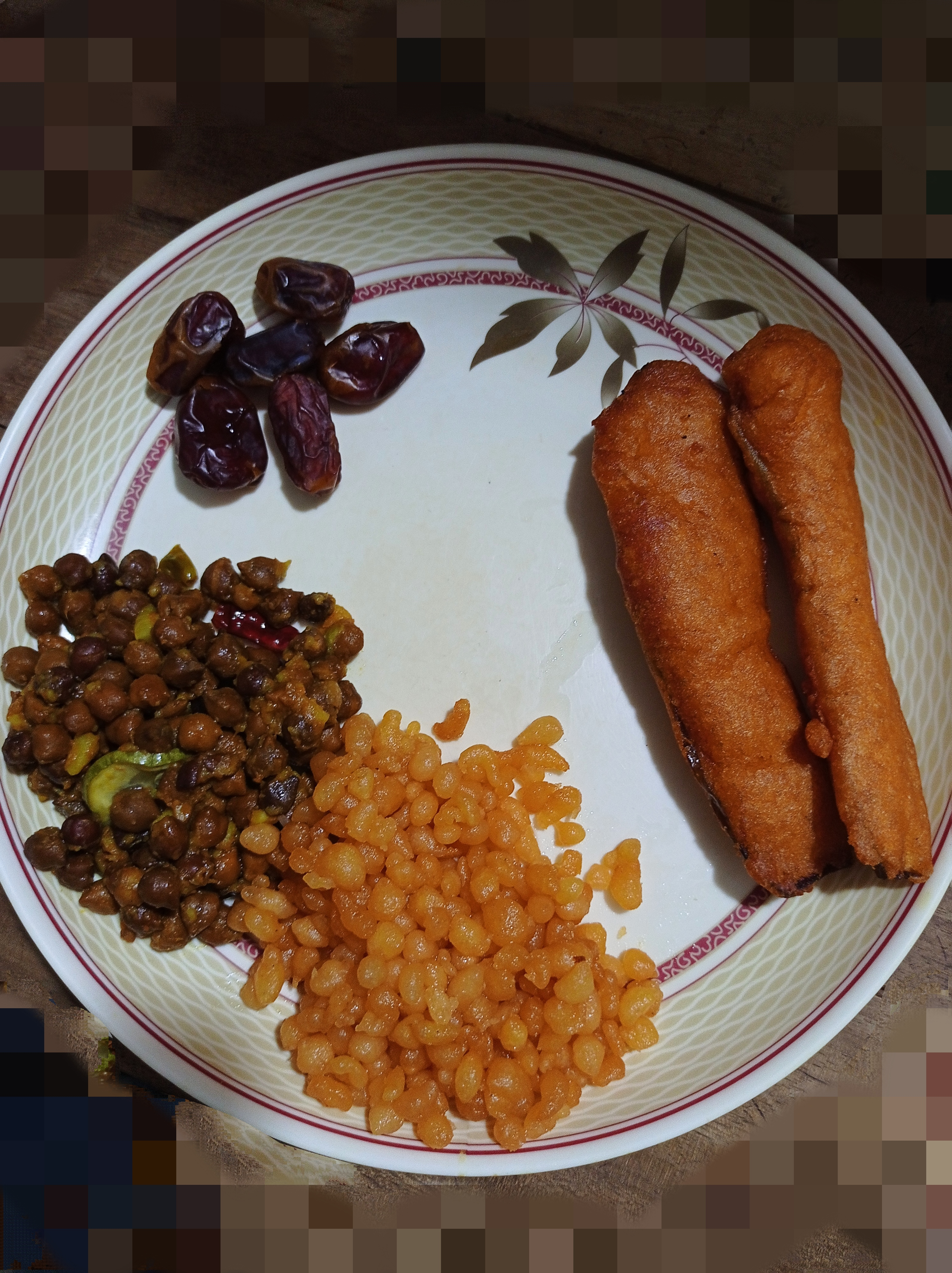
Beguni along with other traditional Bengali iftar items

The dish can be prepared by coating eggplant with besan paste and then frying the pieces in oil. The eggplant is usually cut longitudinally (Bengali: বেগুন begun) and dipped in a batter of Bengal gram flour with salt and turmeric, and deep-fried in mustard oil. Apart from being a regular snack throughout the year in Bengal, Beguni is popularly served as an entrée or side dish with Iftar in Bengali Muslim households during Ramadan.
