= Iftar =

Meal ending the daily fast during Ramadan

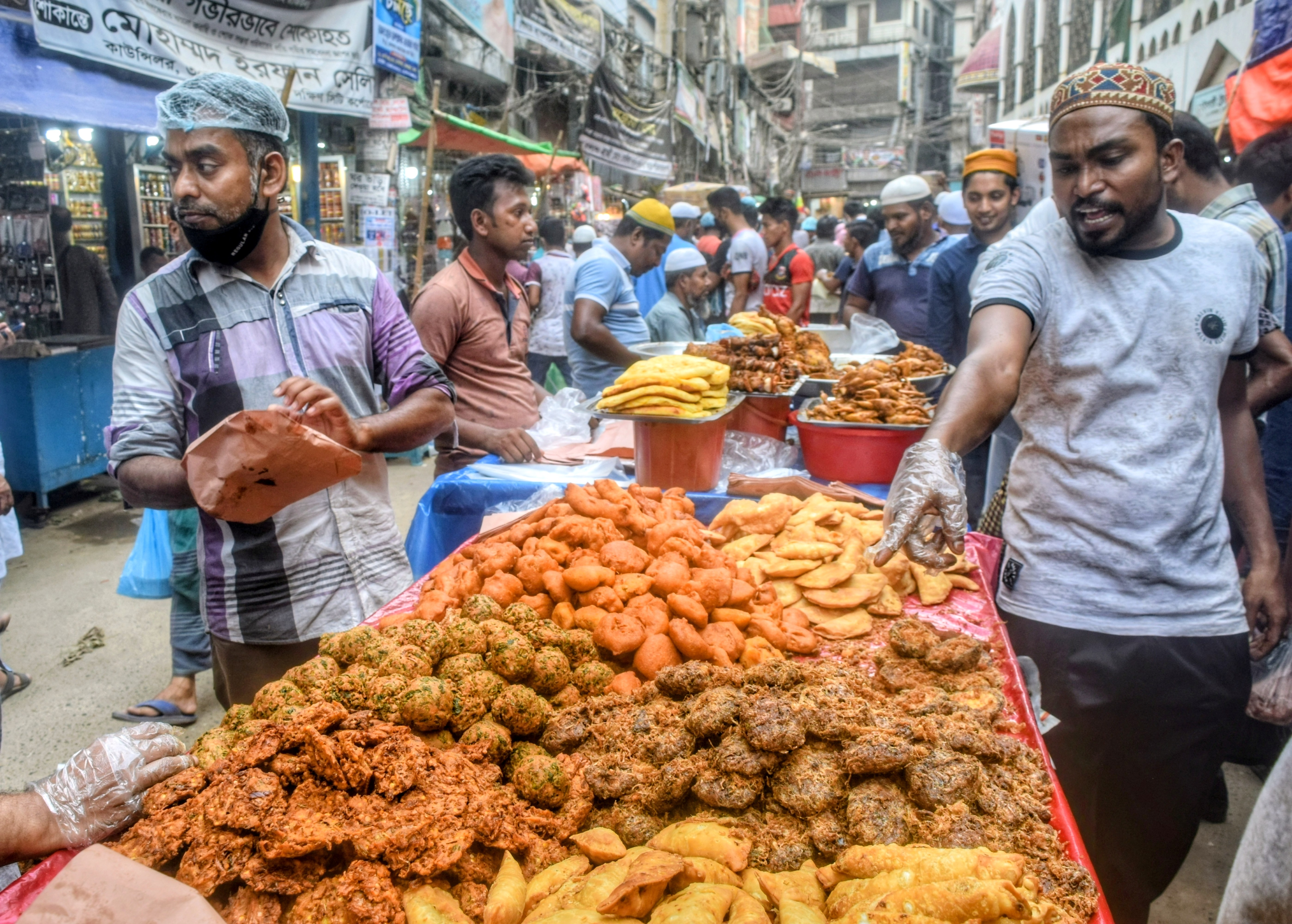
Bangladeshi iftar vendor in Mughal-era Chawkbazar Iftar Market, Old Dhaka

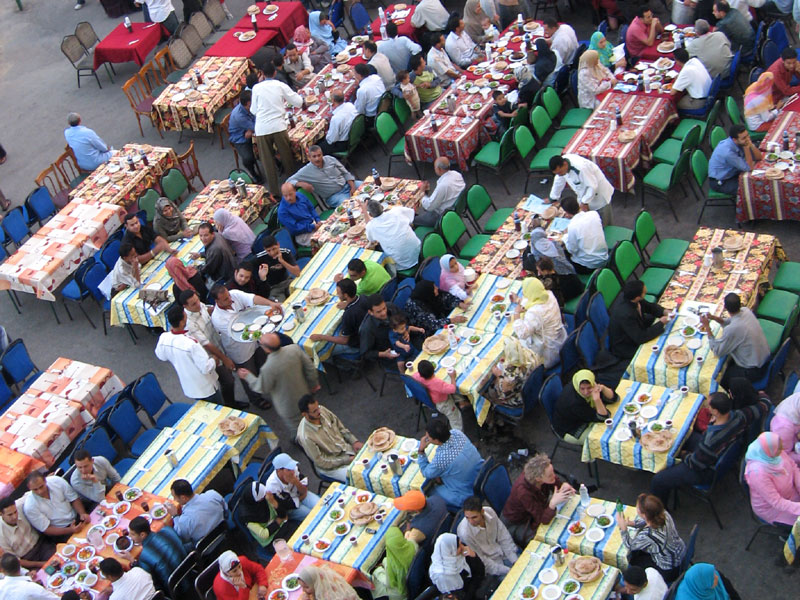
A 2005 iftar in Cairo

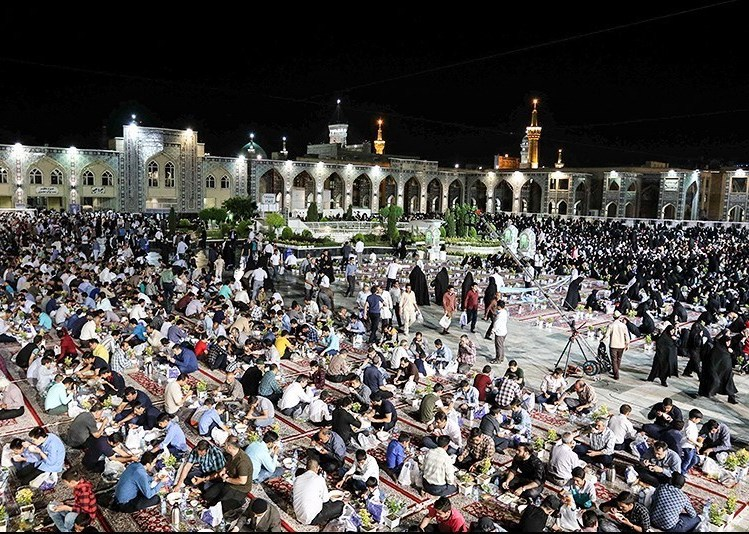
Iftar serving for fasting people at the Imam Reza Shrine in Mashhad, Iran

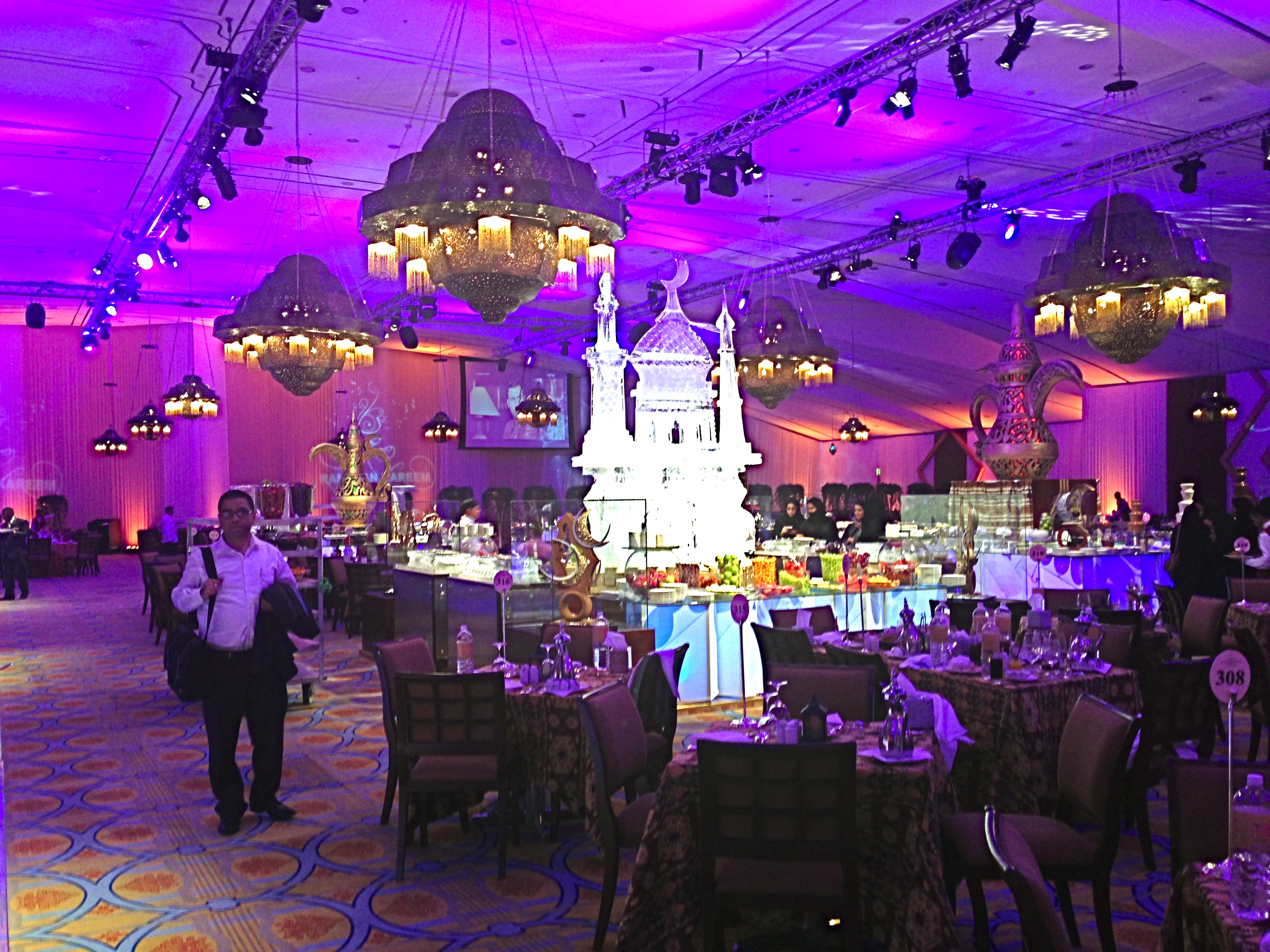
A 2016 iftar buffet in a hotel in Riyadh

Iftar (Arabic: إفطار, romanized: ifṭār; IPA: [ʔif.tˤaːr]) is the fast-breaking evening meal of Muslims in Ramadan at the time of adhan (call to prayer) of the Maghrib prayer.

Iftar is the second meal of the day; during Ramadan, the daily fast begins immediately after the pre-dawn meal of suhur and continues during the daylight hours, ending at sunset with the evening meal of iftar.

In 2023, UNESCO added iftar to its list of Intangible Cultural Heritage.

Families and communities often gather together to share food and prayer. In many Muslim communities, mosques or organizations host large communal iftar meals.

== History ==
The history of iftar is confirmedly deep-rooted in Islamic tradition. It traces its roots to the life of Islamic Prophet Muhammad in the 7th century, when he broke his fast with food and water, establishing a tradition widely emulated by Muslims around the world. The communal aspect of iftar where meals are shared among people help ensure solidarity and community ties.

Iftar has evolved into a rich socio-cultural tradition. This was especially evident during the Islamic Golden Age when affluent individuals would host lavish meals to encourage charity and unity among Muslims. Over time, this practice spread across Muslim-majority countries. Example of such, is the tradition of hosting iftar at the Imam Reza shrine in Iran which has been ongoing for 332 years, highlighting iftar's deep cultural roots. In recognition of its importance, UNESCO designated iftar as an Intangible Cultural Heritage in 2023, celebrating its role in fostering family ties, promoting charity, and preserving cultural heritage.

Up till today, iftar practices differ across regions and countries but it continues to hold deep spiritual and communal significance. Breaking the fast traditionally begins with dates and water, but the dishes served are influenced by local cultures. In South Asia, fried snacks are popular; in the Middle East, large communal tables represent generosity; and in colder climates like Turkey, hearty soups are preferred. Despite obstacles like poverty or conflict in some places, iftar remains a powerful symbol of gratitude, reflection, and connection for Muslims worldwide.

== Description ==
Iftar is one of the religious observances of Ramadan, and is often done as a community, with Muslim people gathering to break their fast together. The meal is taken just after the call to the Maghrib prayer, which is around sunset. Traditionally three dates are eaten to break the fast, in emulation of the Islamic prophet, Muhammad, who broke his fast in this manner, but this is not mandatory. Muslims believe that feeding someone iftar as a form of sadaqah/zakat/charity is very rewarding and that such was practised by Muhammad.

Some Hadith also state that Muhammad used to read the following dua at iftar:

Dhahaba al-zama’ wa abtalat al-‘urooq wa thabat al-ajr Insha’Allah – "Thirst has gone, the veins are moist, and the reward is assured, if Allah wills."

== Around the world ==
=== Afghanistan ===
In Afghanistan, iftar typically begins with dates and water, followed by traditional dishes such as shorwa (meat and vegetable soup), mantu (steamed meat dumplings), bolani (stuffed flatbread), and qabuli palaw (rice with meat, carrots, and raisins). Kebabs and other grilled meats are also common, and meals often conclude with sweet dishes and desserts.

=== Bangladesh ===
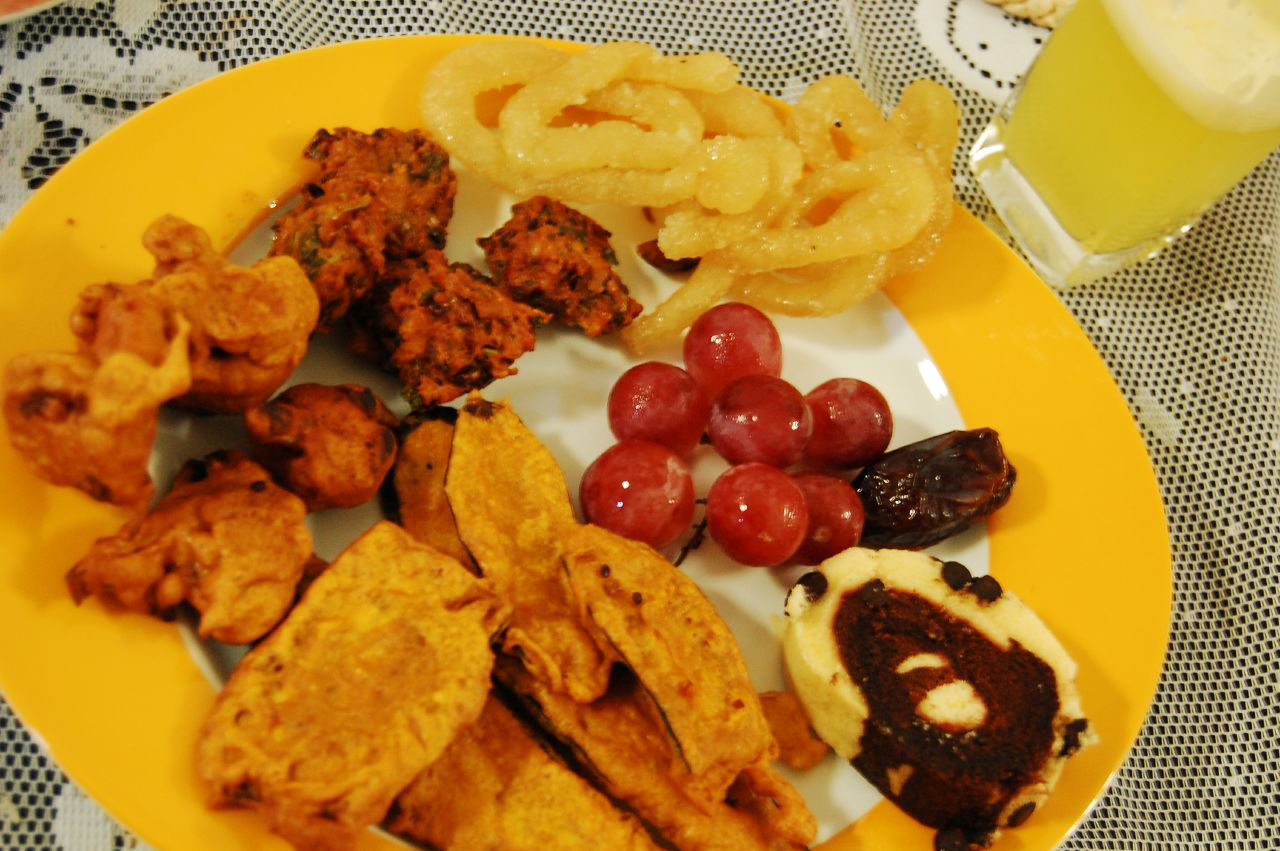
Common iftar items of Bangladesh

In Bangladesh, a wide variety of foods is prepared to break the fast at Maghrib time. Some of the common iftar items from Bangladeshi cuisine include piyaju (made of lentil paste, chopped onions and green chillies, like falafel), beguni (made of thin slices of eggplant dipped in a thin batter of gram flour), jilapi, muri, haleem, dates, samosas, dal puri (a type of lentil-based savoury pastry), chola (cooked Bengal gram), kebab, mughlai porota (stuffed porota with minced meat, eggs and spices), variety of pitha, aloo chop, singara, ghugni, amerti, bundia, nimki, Pakora, khaja, batasa, khabar tula, Bengali sweets, Roasted chickpeas and different types of fruits such as watermelon, apple, banana, papaya, pear, mango and pineapple. Bengalis break their fast with all their friends and family and eat together in a banquet with their array of food; however, savoury items are eaten before the sweet. In the Sylhet region, Furir Bari Iftari is a common cultural tradition among Bengali families.

Drinks such as lemon shorbot and yoghurt shorbot (made of yoghurt, water, sugar and rooh afza) as well as borhani and gurer shorbot (jaggery shorbot) are common on iftar tables across the country. People like to have iftar at home with all family members, and iftar parties are also arranged by mosques. People often distribute iftar in mosques for the people praying to eat, believing it is a good deed. After Iftar people pray maghrib and later Isha then many head straight for Taraweeh prayers where 20 rakats are performed to finish one Juz' of the Quran.

=== Brunei ===
In Brunei Darussalam, iftar is locally referred to as sungkai. Traditionally this is held at a regional or village mosque for those who have or will be performing the evening prayers. At the mosque, a mosque buffet is prepared by the local residents at which all are welcomed to break their fast together. Before the iftar, the beduk (a type of drum) must be heard as a signal to begin the sungkai. In the capital Bandar Seri Begawan, the firing of several cannons at the central business district also marks the sungkai. The sungkai is generally a welcomed time of the day, so Bruneians occasionally break their fast at restaurants along with their extended family. Additionally, only during the month of Ramadan, each district, with the exception of the Brunei and Muara district, hosts an expansive network of tamu or Ramadan stalls where freshly cooked local delicacies are sold more than other times of the year.

=== India ===
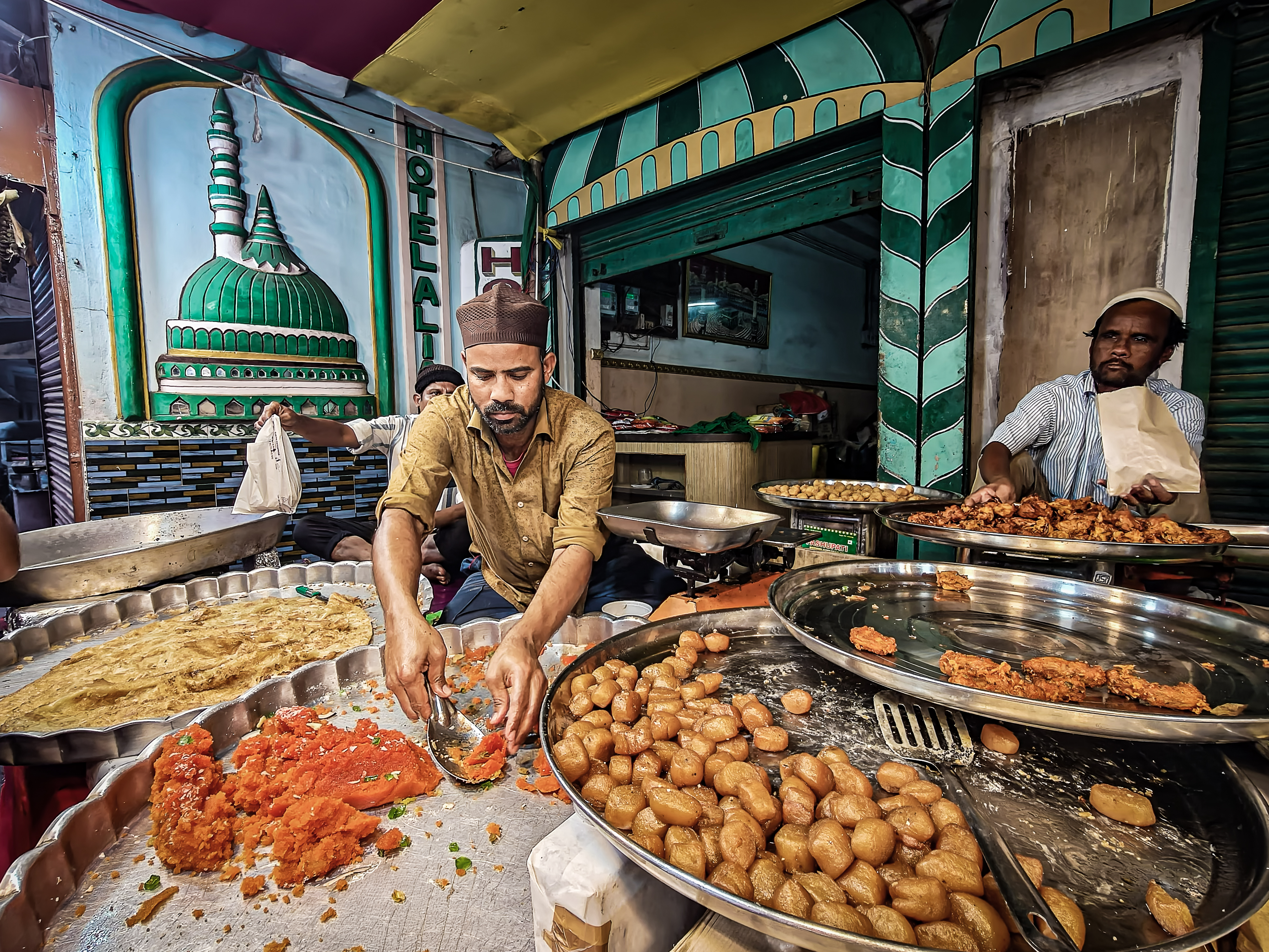
Street food vendors prepare and serve traditional sweet and savoury Iftar snacks at a local market stall as people purchase food for the evening meal during the holy month of Ramadan in Guwahati, Assam, India

In India, Muslims break their fasts with family and friends, and many Mosques arrange free 'iftar.' Preparations for iftar commence hours before, in homes and at roadside stalls. Iftar begins by eating dates or drinking water, but this is only the opening of a rich meal. The spread of 'iftar' can be grand, with both vegetarian to non-vegetarian dishes and a variety of juices and sherbets. Iftar usually is a heavy meal and is followed by a second, lighter dinner eaten before the night (isha) prayers and the taraweeh prayers.

In Hyderabad and nearby areas, people often break their fast with Haleem because it has a rich taste and is quite filling. In other southern states (Tamil Nadu and Kerala), Muslims break their fast with nonbu kanji, a rich, filling rice dish of porridge consistency, cooked for hours with meat and vegetables. This is often served with bonda, bajji, and vadai. Muslims in the area of Vijayawada, Andhra Pradesh serve the aforementioned rice porridge, here called Ganji, with boondhi in it during Iftar.

Vegetarians break their fast with a dish called surkumba, which is prepared from milk, and this is particularly popular in certain parts of Karnataka. In northern states like Delhi, Uttar Pradesh, Madhya Pradesh and West Bengal, the fast is typically ended with fresh dates, cut fresh fruits (sometimes served as chaat) and fruit juice along with fried dishes like samosas, pakodas etc.

=== Indonesia ===
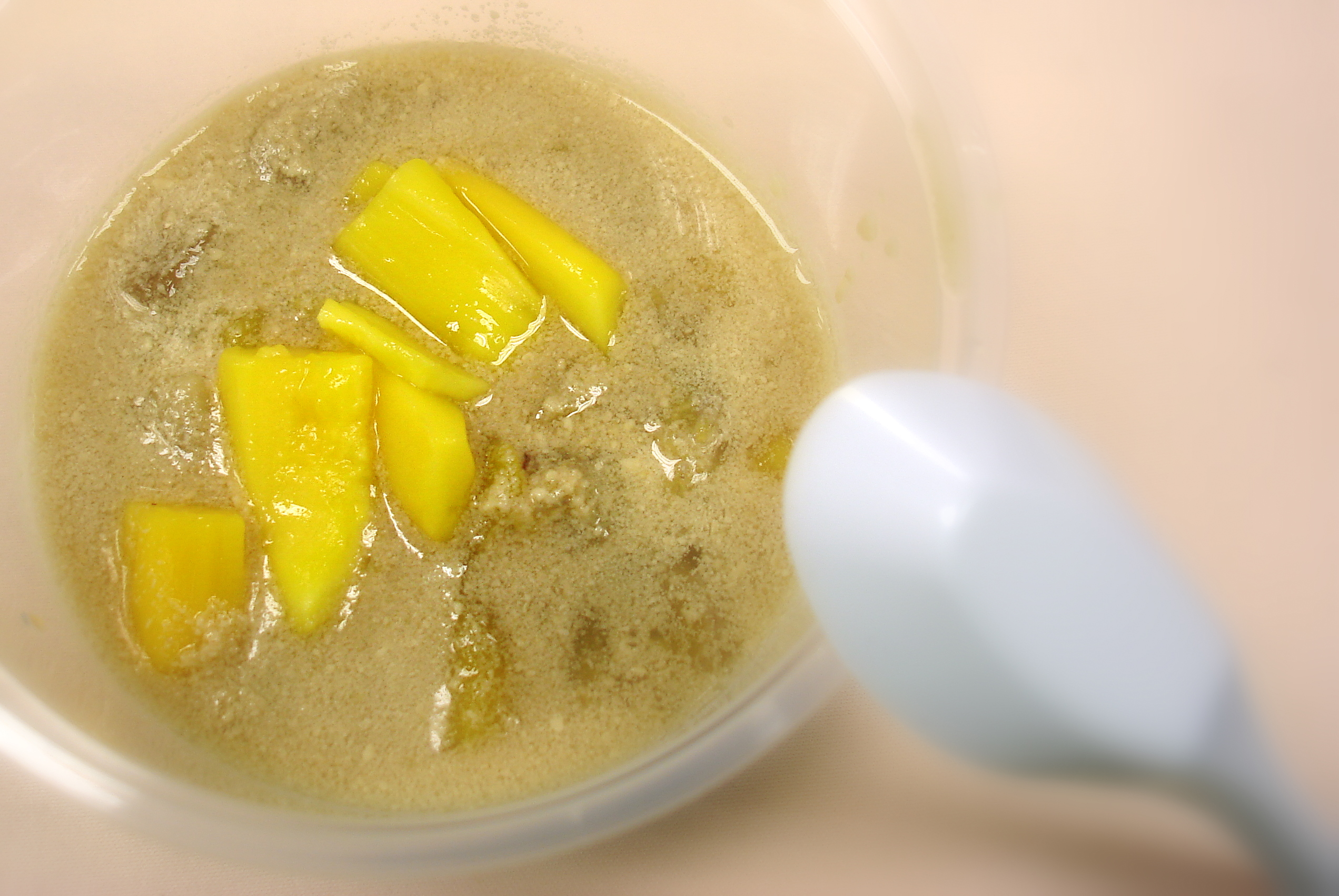
Jackfruit kolak, one of various iftar desserts in Indonesia

In Indonesia iftar is called "buka puasa" or takjil, which means "to open the fast". Markets sell various foods for iftar, including the date, which is popular, as well as unique Indonesian sweet food and drink such as kolak, es kelapa muda, es buah, es campur, cendol or dawet, etc. Most of them are only found easily in Ramadan. Iftar is usually begun by eating these sweets, as inspired by the Prophet's Sunnah of eating dates.

Maghrib time is traditionally marked by the bedug, a traditional big Indonesian drum. After Asr prayers, traditional markets will begin to open. The food stalls generally sell many kinds of items that are specifically for "iftar". Traffic jams often occur leading up to Maghrib time. Sometimes people invite groups of orphans to eat with them. After Iftar and maghrib prayer which is usually done at the homes, people go to the mosque for Isha'a and Tarawih prayers, which in Indonesia, is often accompanied by a short sermon known as "ceramah" before the Tarawih prayer commence.

=== Iran ===
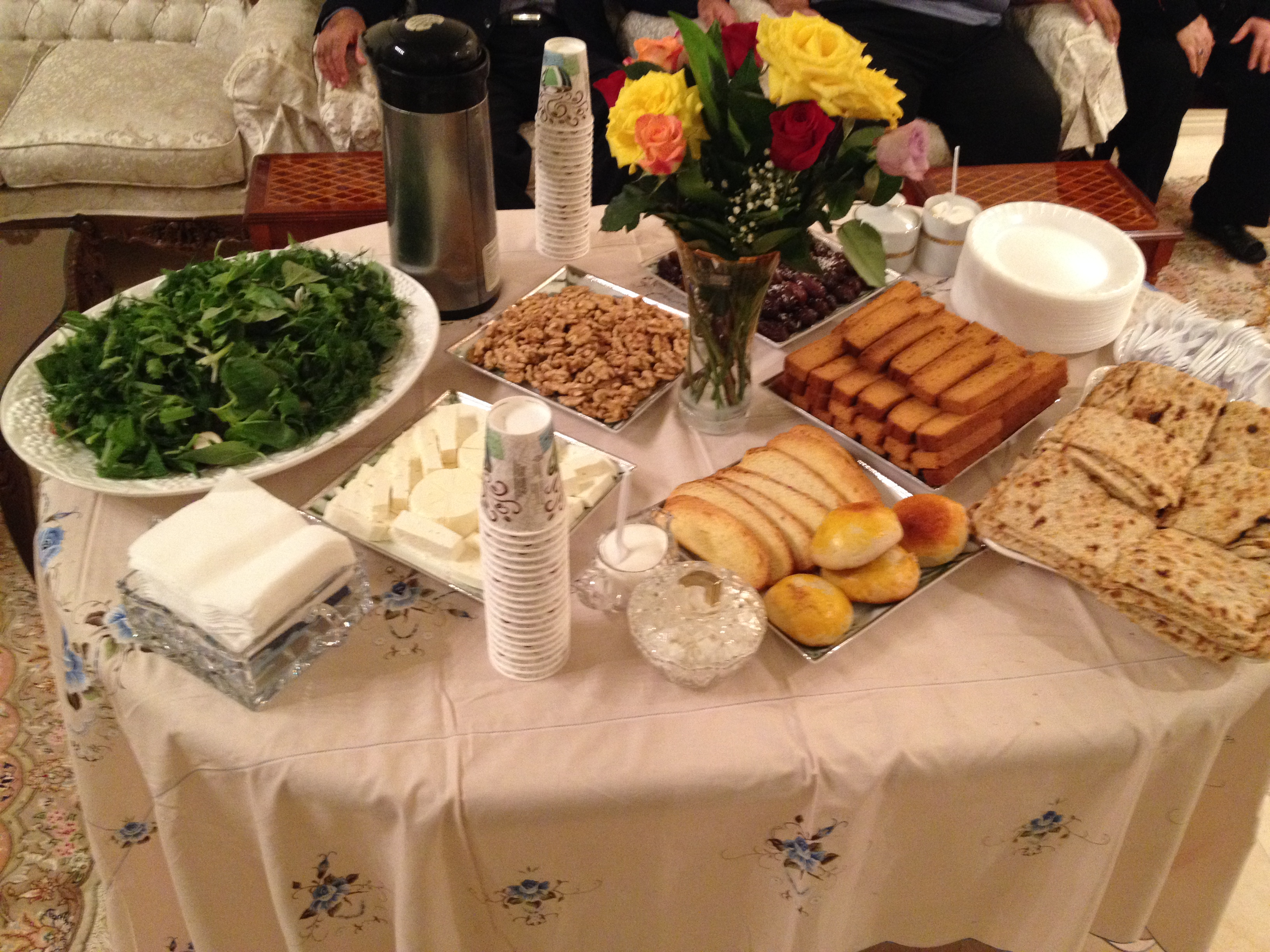
An example of Iranian Iftar table. Dinner will be served later.

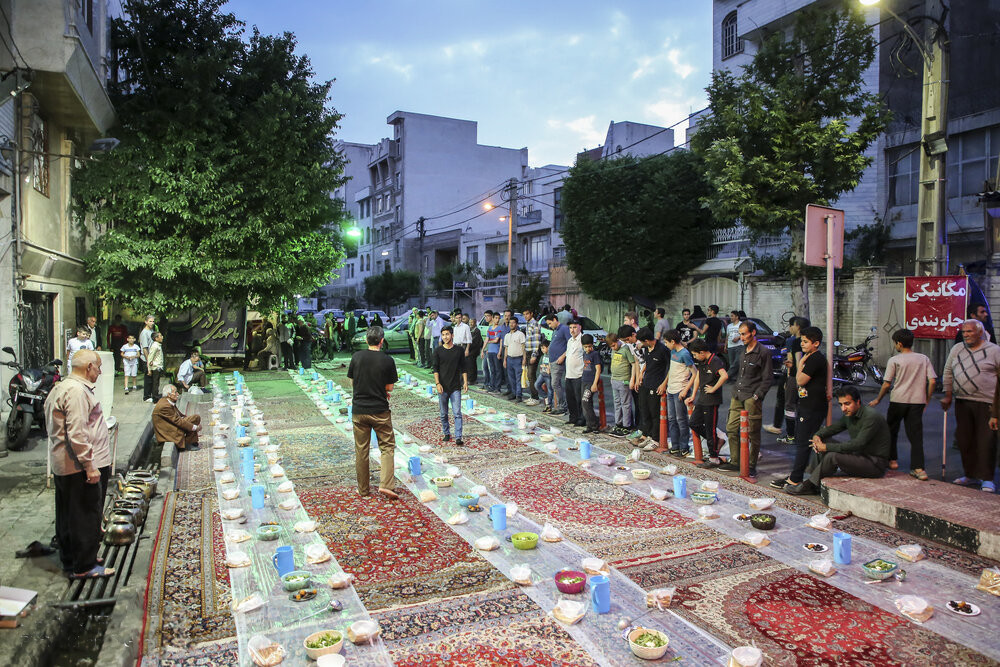
An example of Iranian public Iftar

In Iran, neighbourhood iftar feasts are not customary; the (larger and more festive) meal is usually shared among family. A small selection of foods is prepared to break the fast and is summarily followed by a proper Persian meal. Most common iftar items are: Chai (tea) with zulbia and bamiyeh and other sweets, dates, halva, Fereni, Ash Reshteh, Halim, Shami Lapeh, Noon (bread usually lavash or barbari) and paneer with greens and fresh herbs. One of the biggest iftar meals in the world takes place in Imam Reza shrine in Mashhad city every year, with some 12 thousand people attending every night.

=== Kurdistan ===
In Kurdistan, sometimes iftar is eaten in mosques. In the mosques people break their fast (sawm) by dates, water, milk, and coffee. And later, they eat their dinner in there.

=== Malaysia ===
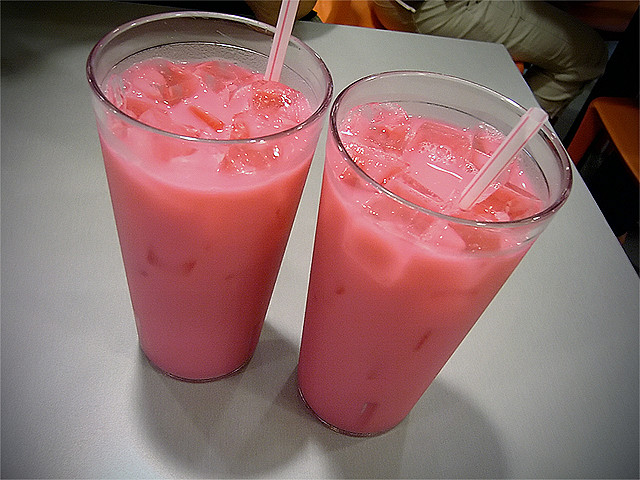
Bandung, the most common drink during Iftar in Malaysia

In Malaysia, iftar is known as "berbuka puasa", which literally means "to open the fast". As usual, the Muslims break the fast with either dried or fresh dates. Various foodstuffs from the Malaysian cuisine tend to be readily available from Bazaar Ramadhans, which are street food markets that are open during Ramadan; local favourites include bandung drink, sugarcane juice, soybean milk mixed with grass jelly, nasi lemak, laksa, ayam percik, chicken rice, satay and popiah among others. Many high-end restaurants and hotels also provide special iftar and dinner packages for those who want to break the fast outside with families and friends. Furthermore, most mosques also provide free bubur lambok (a special type of rice congee) after Asar prayers.

Most Muslims will usually have a special supper after performing their tarawih prayers called moreh (pronounced Malay pronunciation: [moˈreh]). The light meal, taking place in mosque and prayer hall grounds, consists of local traditional snacks and hot tea.

In shopping malls and public venues in Malaysia, the time of iftar is indicated by radios announcing the call to Maghrib prayers.

=== Maldives ===
In the Maldives, iftar is known as roadha villun, which means "break fast". As usual, most Muslims break the fast with either dried or fresh dates. There are many exclusive restaurants and hotels providing special iftar and dinner packages for those who want to break the fast outside with the families and friends. All the mosques in the Maldives provide free dates and juice to break fast. At local homes, one will find various cold fruit juices (water melon, mango, passion fruit, pineapple) sweet (boakiba, pudding) and salty shorteats called hedhika (boakiba, bajiya, gulha, masroshi, cutlets), the latter made with mainly fish, curries, roshi and salads made with local greens, chilli, onion and lemon.

=== Morocco ===
In Morocco, dishes traditionally associated with breaking the Ramadan fast include dates, harira, sfouf, and chebakia.

=== Nigeria ===
Nigeria hosts what is by some way the largest Muslim community in West Africa and Sub-Saharan Africa. Iftar (known in the Hausa Language as buda-baki and in the Yoruba language as isinu) holds the same importance in Nigeria's Sunni population as the rest of the Islamic world. Foods include Jollof rice, suya, ọbẹ̀ ẹgúsí, ewurẹ, àkàrà, dabinu/dabino, ọ̀pọ̀tọ́, etc.

=== Pakistan ===
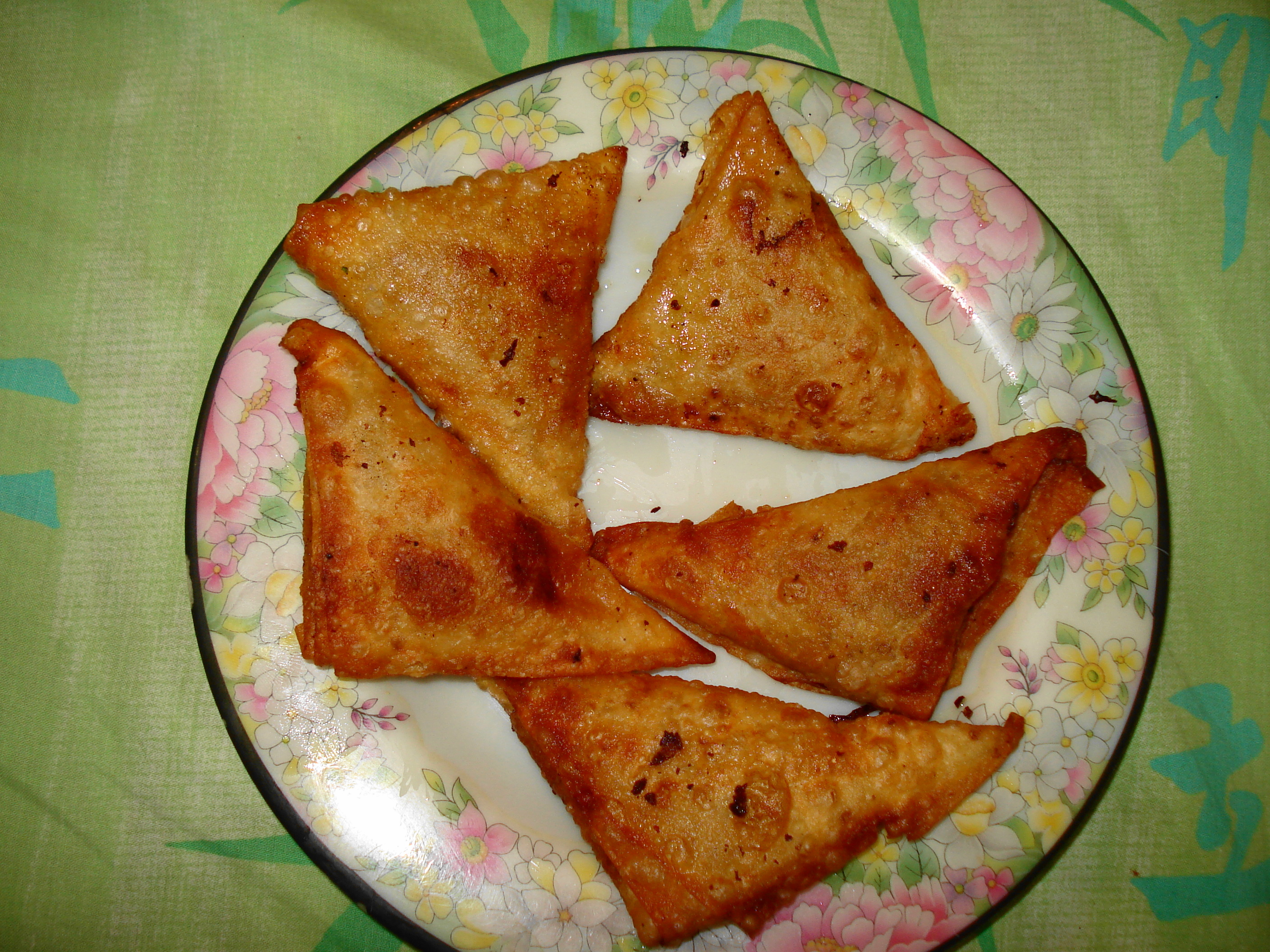
Samosas are a common Iftari snack in Pakistan.

In Pakistan, almost everybody stops to rejoice for a few minutes following the iftar sirens and adhan (call to prayer). Preparations for iftar commence about three hours beforehand, in homes and at roadside stalls. The fast can be ended by eating dates, or simply by drinking water, if dates are not available. Many restaurants offer iftar deals, especially in the big cities like Karachi, Lahore, and Islamabad. Iftar as a meal in Pakistan is usually heavy, consisting mainly of sweet and savoury treats such as jalebi (pretzel-shaped, deep-fried batter, soaked in sugar syrup), samosas(minced meat and/or vegetables, wrapped in dough and deep-fried or baked), pakora (sliced vegetables, dipped in batter and deep-fried) with ketchup or chatni, and namak para (seasoned cracker), besides the staple dates and water.

Other items such as chicken rolls, spring rolls, Shami Kebabs, fruit salads, papad (sheets of batter that are then sun-dried, deep-fried or roasted until they have the texture of potato chips or crisps), chana chaat (chickpea salad), and dahi balay (or "dahi baray"—fried lentil dumplings served with yoghurt) are also very common. Amongst the Punjabi, Sindhi and Mohajir households, iftar is often followed up by a regular dinner later during the night. Those in the north and west, including Pashtuns, Balochis, and Tajiks, on the other hand combine dinner and iftar. Laghman soup (noodle soup), locally called Kalli, is an iftar staple in Chitral and parts of Gilgit.

After iftar, Muslims rush to the mosques to offer Tarawih (an 8 or 20 rakat Muslim prayer during the month of Ramadan). Various television channels also stop their normal telecast and broadcast special Ramadan transmissions, especially at the time of Sehar and Iftar. The whole month of Ramadan is marked in Pakistan as a festive season when people make donations to the poor and give charity. Some organizations and companies also offer free iftar meals to the common people.

=== Russia ===
In Russia, Ramadan is observed mostly in Muslim-majority states such as Dagestan, Chechnya, Ingushetia, Adygea, Kabardino-Balkaria, Karachay-Cherkessia, Tatarstan and Bashkortostan. In cities outside of Muslim majority republics with a significant Muslim presence, it has become a tradition to open Ramadan Tent, a public iftar event organised by Russia's Mufti Council. In Dagestan, Muslims gather in Makhachkala Central Juma Mosque to break their fast and pray taraweeh prayers. Dates and fruits are preferred to break the fast, followed by soup, bread, and different local delicacies such as beşbarmaq, kurze and others.

=== Singapore ===
In Singapore, iftar is called "buka puasa", meaning "to open the fast" (see the Indonesian section). It is usually accompanied with dates and sweet drinks such as Bandung, Chendol and Air Sirap. Singaporean Muslims usually eat an array of dishes ranging from rice and noodles. Many buy food from bazaars that can be found in different parts of the city state such as in Bugis, Kampong Glam, Geylang Serai and even in populated towns such as Tampines, Jurong East, Jurong West, Clementi and West Coast.

=== Sri Lanka ===
Muslims in Sri Lanka make special snacks /appetisers at Muslim homes, such as samosas, cutlets, rolls, kanjee, falooda and many more dishes. They eat iftar with the family if possible. Muslims believe that giving to the poor is very rewarding. They eat a date and drink some water to break the fast or to perform iftar. Then they have the prepared meal. Some people like to prepare foods and give to the people performing iftar in the mosques.

=== Syria ===
A very large percentage of Syrians are Muslims, fasting the month of Ramadan. Syria's streets are filled with its joyous citizens during this holy month. In Syria, the fast is usually broken with a cup of water and dates. There are loads of restaurants that provide special iftar and dinner for those who want to break the fast with their families and friends. When eating Iftar at home, a special type of pastry called "Burak" (برك in Arabic) is fried and enjoyed (there are cheese and meat varieties). Tamarind Juice is traditionally drunk in the Iftar meal, and fattoush is a popular salad option along with tabbouleh. After Iftar, families will visit the mosque to play the Taraweeh prayer. Syria's locals have a sweet tooth, and enjoy various types of sweets like Awamat, Knafe, Halawet el Jibn, Baklava, and much more.

=== Taiwan ===
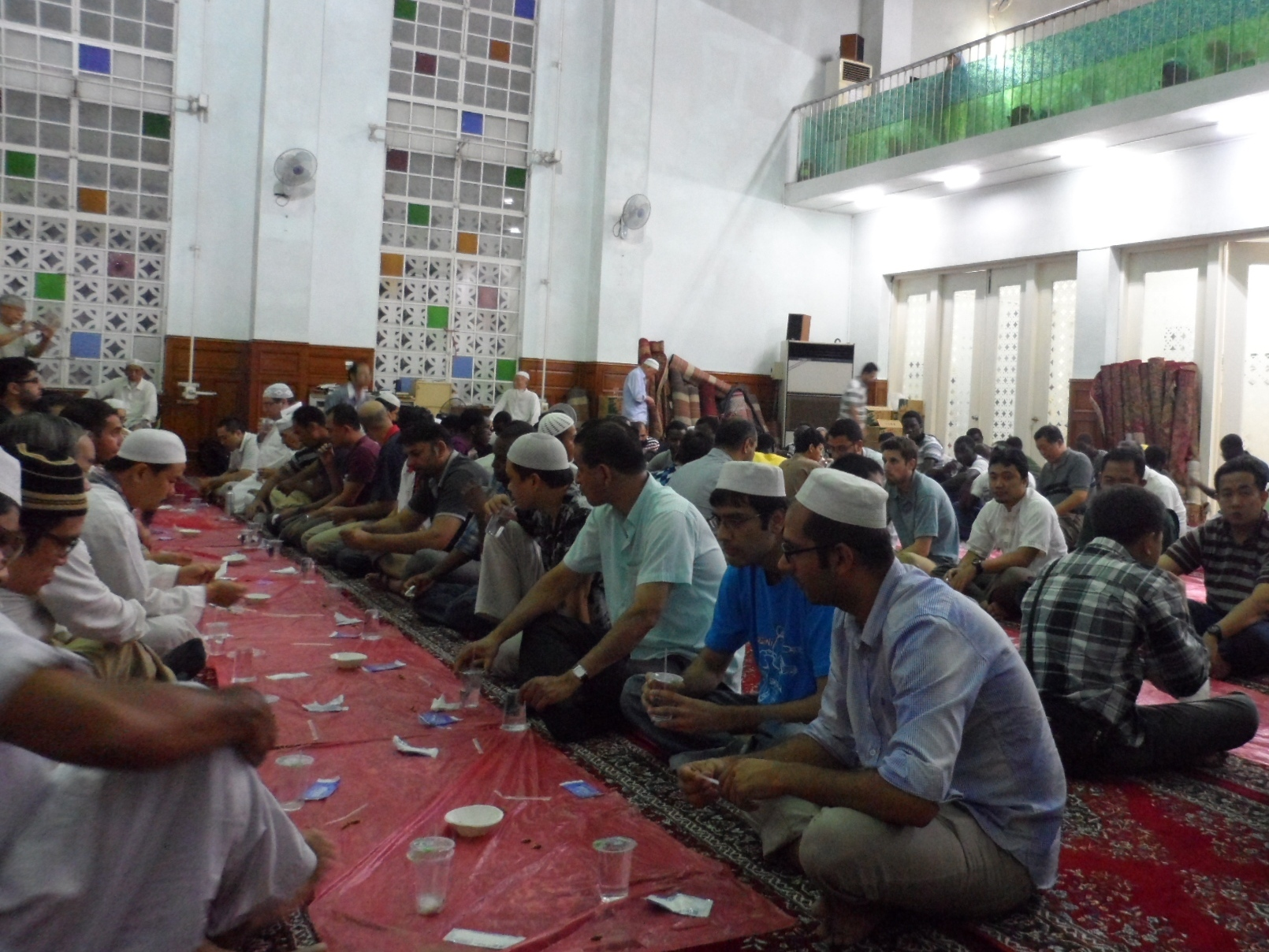
Iftar at Taipei Grand Mosque, Taiwan

Islam is a minority religion in Taiwan. During Ramadan, major mosques around Taiwan are filled with Muslims going to have their iftar followed by Tarawih prayer. Muslims in Taiwan usually break their fast with dates and water.

=== Trinidad and Tobago ===
In Trinidad and Tobago, Muslims represent about 6% of the population. Iftar is traditionally performed in the social setting of the Masjid. Various food items showing the mixed ethnic nature of the country are usually available. Fare may include fried rice; roti; curried chicken, goat, and duck; curried channa; and alloo (potato). Depending on the persons presenting the meal, it may even include such non-traditional items as macaroni pie. The meal is usually served with persons sitting at tables with the components of the meal brought to the tables.

=== Turkey ===
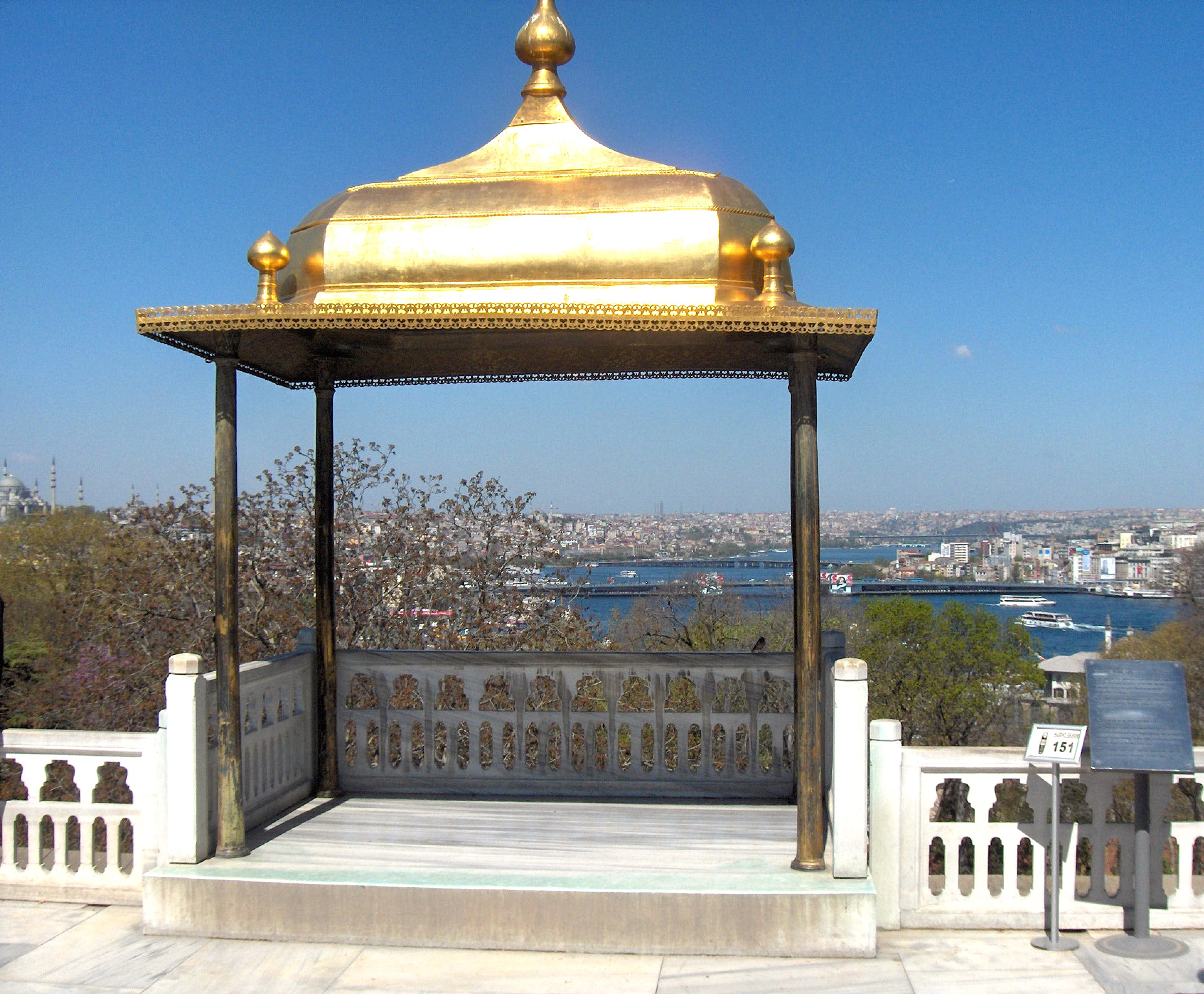
The gilded Iftar bower of Topkapi Palace where the Ottoman sultan-caliphs would break the fast

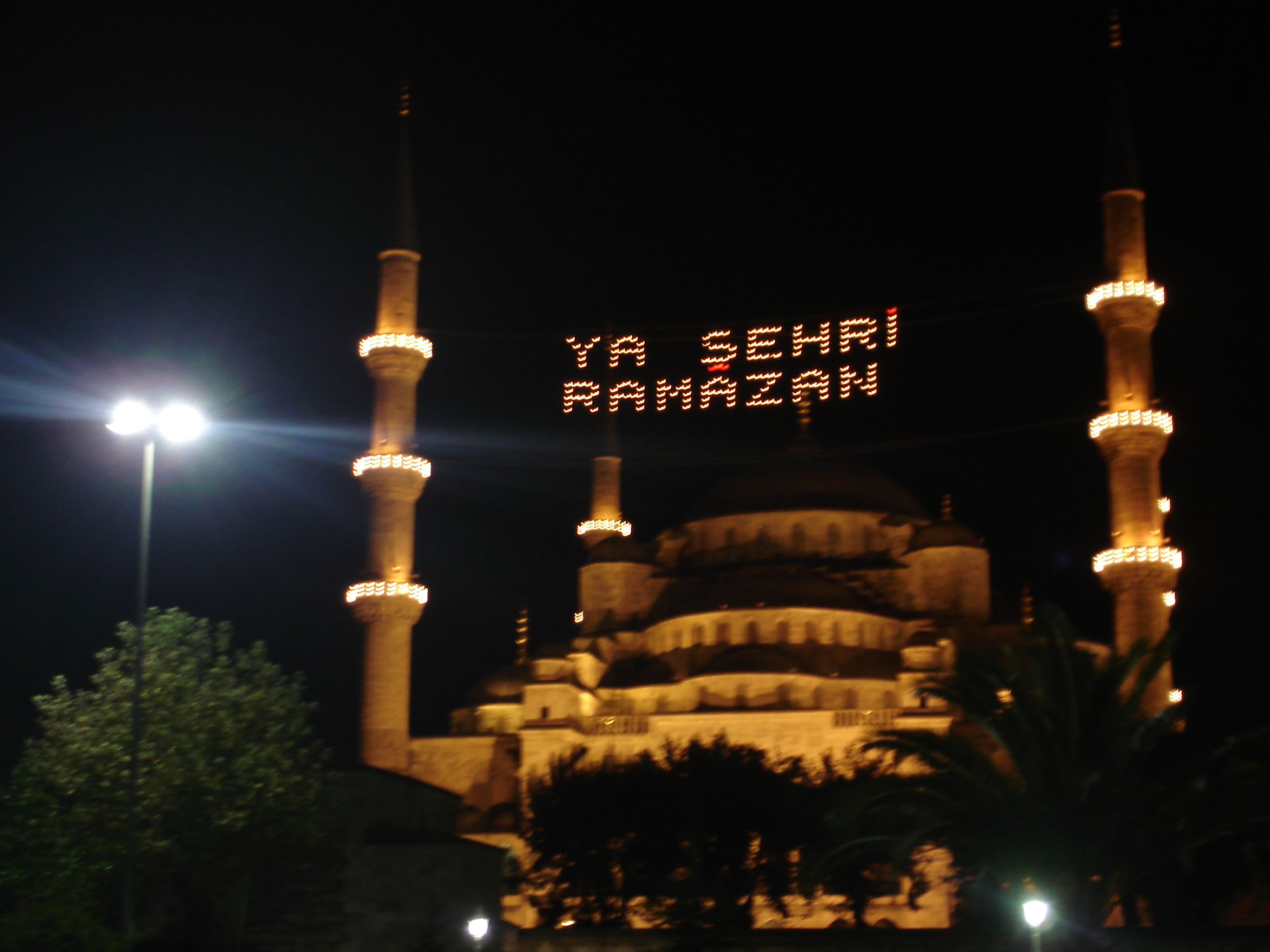
Sultan Ahmed Mosque with the kandils lit. The lights in this example spell out holiday greetings.

In Turkey and Northern Cyprus, the month of Ramadan is celebrated with great joy, and iftar dinners play a big part in this. In larger cities like Istanbul all of the restaurants offer special deals and set menus for iftar. Most of the set menus start with a soup or an appetiser platter called iftariye. It consists of dates, olives, cheese, pastırma, sujuk, Ramazan pidesi (a special bread only baked during Ramadan), and various pastries called börek. The main course consists of various Turkish foods, especially the Ottoman Palace Traditional Foods. A dessert called güllaç is served in most places. Most of the fine-dining restaurants offer live musical performances of Ottoman classical music, Turkish music and Sufi music.

Most of the Ramadan celebration practices in Turkey have their roots in the traditions of the former Ottoman Empire. At the minarets of mosques, lights called kandil are switched on from sunset to dawn. As soon as the sun sets, a traditional "Ramadan Cannon" is fired from the highest hill in every city as a signal to start eating the iftar.

In Istanbul, one of the more notable places to celebrate the iftar dinner is the Sultanahmet Square. Located near the Sultan Ahmed Mosque (Blue Mosque) the Sultanahmet Square hosts many activities, including mini restaurants opened during the month of Ramadan, special shows, and traditional Ottoman theatrical shows. At Topkapi Palace the Ottoman sultan-caliphs would break their fast under the gilded bower.

The Tarawih prayer is mostly practised in Turkish mosques as 20 rekahs, broken into 5 groups of 4 rekahs. Between each set of 4 rekahs, a hymn composed by the Turkish musician Buhurizade Itri is sung by all people attending the prayer. The hymn is a prayer to praise the Islamic prophet Muhammad.

As Ramadan is also the month of almsgiving, many people organise iftar dinners for the poor, students, guests, and foreigners. People can find Turkish food available in most mosques.

=== Ukraine ===
In 2023, the president of Ukraine officially started the tradition of iftar. This is due to the fact that the indigenous people of Ukraine are Crimean Tatars—Turkic-speaking Muslims (Crimean Peninsula).

=== United States and Canada ===
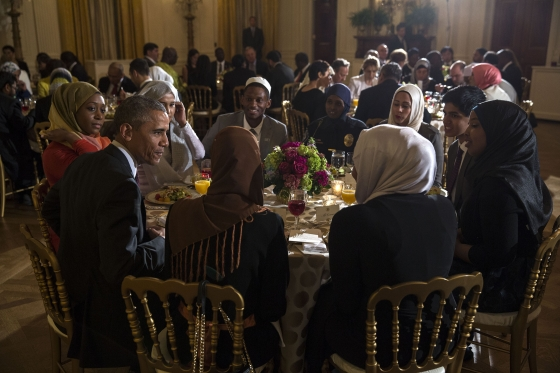
President Barack Obama hosts an Ramadan Iftar dinner celebrating Ramadan in the East Room of the White House.

Iftar meals in the United States and Canada are often held at mosques, households, and Islamic community centres.

On 9 December 1805, President Thomas Jefferson postponed dinner at the White House until sunset to accommodate an envoy from Tunis, an event considered by many to be the first White House iftar.

The first official iftar was held at the White House in 1996, hosted by First Lady Hillary Clinton, and iftar meals were subsequently held annually at the White House and hosted by the U.S. president and the first lady until 2016. President Donald Trump did not host an iftar dinner at the White House in 2017, his first year in office, but resumed the tradition on June 6, 2018, hosting friends and diplomatic staff from many Muslim-majority nations.

Beginning in 1996, the United States Department of State held an annual iftar dinner for local and national community leaders and faith groups as well as foreign policy officials. This practice ceased in 2017, when Secretary of State Rex Tillerson declined to host an iftar. The Pentagon continues its tradition of holding an iftar for Muslim members of the U.S. armed forces and special guests from other nations; the first such iftar under the Trump administration was held on 15 June 2017.

The occasion has also been marked in Jewish synagogues. In 2012, iftar was recognized with events at three synagogues in Chicago, Illinois.

Canadian Prime Minister Stephen Harper extended an invitation to Muslim leaders to break the Ramadan fast with him at the prime minister's residence in 2015. This was the first time the prime minister's office had hosted an iftar.

== See also ==
- Breakfast
- Eid ul-Fitr
