= White House Iftar dinner =

The White House Iftar dinner is an annual reception held at the White House and hosted by the U.S. president and first lady to celebrate the Muslim month of Ramadan. The annual tradition started in 1996 when Hillary Clinton hosted a Ramadan Eid celebration dinner. The modern iteration of the reception is attended by prominent members of the Muslim American community including politicians, community leaders and students.

== History ==
Thomas Jefferson held the first White House Iftar dinner while hosting Sidi Soliman Mellimelli, an envoy of Beylik of Tunis, on December 9, 1805. Jefferson adjusted the timing of the meal to after sunset to accommodate Islamic Ramadan traditions.

Following this, it is probable that Ramadan was not commemorated at the White House until 1996, although Jimmy Carter sent Eid greetings to "our fellow Americans of the Muslim faith" in 1980.

=== Annual receptions ===
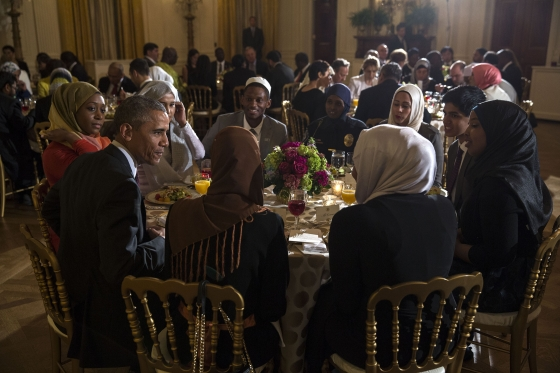
President Barack Obama hosts an Iftar dinner celebrating Ramadan in the East Room of the White House.

President Bill Clinton continued the tradition, as did George W. Bush who hosted an iftar dinner at the White House in 2001. Bush subsequently continued the dinners every year of his two terms. Barack Obama hosted his first Ramadan dinner in 2009, and subsequently every year of his presidency.

In 2017, Donald Trump broke the two decade old White House tradition by opting not to host an Iftar dinner at the White House. Trump reestablished the Iftar dinner tradition at the White House on June 6, 2018 and in 2019 the White House held the Iftar dinner on May 13, 2019. The second Donald Trump administration continued the tradition, holding an Iftar dinner on March 27, 2025.

In 2024, following anger and protests over his handling of the Gaza war, including from Arab and Muslim leaders in Michigan, President Joe Biden held "a quiet, dramatically downsized iftar gathering". Many Muslim American community leaders declined attending out of concerns of the Biden administration's support for Israel, and rising Islamophobia in the United States.

== See also ==
- White House Passover Seder
- List of dining events
- Iftar party
