= Hello (disambiguation) =

Hello is a greeting in the English language.

Hello may also refer to:

== Art, entertainment, and media ==
=== Films ===
- Hello (1999 film), a Tamil film directed by Selva Bharathy
- Hello (2007 film), a Malayalam film
- Hello (2008 film), a Bollywood thriller
- Hello (2011 film), a Ugandan short film
- Hello (2017 film), a Telugu film

=== Television ===
- "Hello", an episode of The Good Doctor
- "Hell-O" (Glee), a 2010 episode of Glee

=== Music ===
==== Artists ====
- Hello (band), British glam rock band

==== Albums ====
- Hello (After Edmund album), 2008
- Hello (The Capes album), 2005
- Hello (Half Japanese album), 2001
- Hello (Hedley album), 2015
- Hello (Poe album), 1995
- Hello (Cho Yong-pil album), 2013
- Hello! (album), by Status Quo, 1973
- Hello...x, by Tristan Prettyman, 2008
- Hello EP, by The Minus 5, 1995
- Hello (Karmin EP), 2012
- Hello (Mamamoo EP), 2014
- Hello (Joy EP), 2021
- Hell-O, by Gwar, 1988
- Hello, repackaged version of Lucifer (Shinee album), 2010
- Hello, by Joy, 1986
- Hello, an EP by Tatyana Ali, 2014

==== Songs ====
- "Hello" (Adele song), 2015
- "Hello" (Aya Ueto song), 2003
- "Hello" (The Beloved song), 1990
- "Hello" (The Cat Empire song), 2003
- "Hello" (Hedley song), 2015
- "Hello" (Ice Cube song), 2000
- "Hello!" (Joe Inoue song), 2008
- "Hello" (Joy song), 2021
- "Hello" (Karmin song), 2011
- "Hello" (Kelly Clarkson song), 2011
- "Hello" (Lionel Richie song), 1984
- "Hello" (Martin Solveig and Dragonette song), 2010
- "Hello" (Masaharu Fukuyama song), 1995
- "Hello" (Mohombi song), Melodifestivalen 2019 song
- "Hello" (Pop Smoke song), 2021
- "Hello" (Poe song), 1996
- "Hello" (The Potbelleez song), 2011
- "Hello" (Stafford Brothers song), featuring Lil Wayne and Christina Milian, 2013
- "Hello" (Riho Furui song), 2025
- "Hello (Follow Your Own Star)", by Christina Aguilera, 2004
- "Hello (I Love You)", by Roger Waters, 2007
- "Hello (Paradise Kiss)", by Yui, 2011
- "Hello (Turn Your Radio On)", by Shakespears Sister, 1991, also covered by Queensberry
- "Hello! (Good to Be Back)", by Scooter, 2005
- "Hello", by Above & Beyond from Acoustic II, 2016
- "Hello", by Baby Chaos from Love Your Self Abuse, 1996
- "Hello", by Beyoncé from I Am... Sasha Fierce, 2008
- "Hello", by Blackfield, 2003
- "Hello", by Candîce Hillebrand, 2003
- "Hello", by Cardi B from Am I the Drama?, 2025
- "Hello?" by Clairo featuring Rejjie Snow from Diary 001, 2018
- "Hello", by Cody Simpson from Paradise, 2012
- "Hello", by Dan Zanes and Friends ft. Barbara Brousal from Rocket Ship Beach, 2000
- "Hello", by Eminem from Relapse, 2009
- "Hello", by Erykah Badu from But You Caint Use My Phone, 2015
- "Hello", by Evanescence from Fallen, 2003
- "Hello", by J. Cole from 2014 Forest Hills Drive, 2014
- "Hello", by James from Millionaires, 1999
- "Hello", by Jimmy Harnen from Can't Fight the Midnight, 1989
- "Hello", by Joy from Hello, 1986
- "Hello", by Jung Yong-hwa and Sunwoo Jung-a from the collaboration "Empathy", 2016
- "Hello", by Kylie Minogue from Tension II, 2024
- "Hello", by LL Cool J from G.O.A.T., 2000
- "Hello", by Oasis from (What's the Story) Morning Glory?, 1995
- "Hello", by Purple Kiss, from Into Violet, 2021
- "Hello", by Prince, a B-side of "Pop Life", 1985
- "Hello", by Prism from See Forever Eyes, 1978
- "Hello", by Pritam, Shaan, and Sunidhi Chauhan from the Indian film Speed, 2007
- "Hello", by Rock Goddess from Young and Free, 1987
- "Hello", by Shinee from Lucifer, 2010
- "Hello", by T.I. from King, 2006
- "Hello", by T.I. from Trouble Man: Heavy Is the Head, 2012
- "Hello", by Twice from Formula of Love: O+T=<3
- "Hello", by Ty Dolla Sign from Campaign, 2016
- "Hello", by will.i.am from #willpower, 2013
- "Hello", by Zerobaseone from You Had Me at Hello, 2024
- "Hello", by Zooey Deschanel from Trolls, 2016
- "Hello!", from the musical The Book of Mormon, 2011

=== Other media ===
- Hello! (magazine), a British celebrity magazine
- Hello (web series), a 2017 Indian web series

== Computing and technology ==
- Hello, a discontinued software program for Picasa
- Hello, a discontinued WebRTC program for Firefox
- Hello.jpg, a notorious image featured on shock site Goatse.cx
- Hello (company), a sleep-tracking company
- Hello (Chinese company), a bicycle-sharing company based in China
- Hello (social network), a social networking service founded by Orkut Büyükkökten
- Hello world program, a software programming demonstration
- Windows Hello, a feature of Microsoft Windows 10

== Other uses ==
- Hello (name)
- Hello (airline), a Swiss charter airline
- Hello convention, bidding convention in bridge

== See also ==
- Hello Hello (disambiguation)
- Hallo (disambiguation)
- HELO (disambiguation)
- Hallo (disambiguation)
- Haro (disambiguation)
