= Los Bravos discography =

- Studio albums: 6
- Compilation albums: 9
- Singles: 28

This is the discography of Spanish beat group Los Bravos.

== Albums ==
=== Studio albums ===
Title	Album details	Peak chart positions		
Title	Album details	FRA	US	UK
Black Is Black	Released: 1966; Label: Columbia, Press, Decca; English-language version also released	5	93	29
Los chicos con las chicas	Released: 1967; Label: Columbia	—	—	—
Dame un poco de amor (Bring a Little Lovin')	Released: 1968; Label: Columbia	—	—	—
Ilustrisimos Bravos	Released: 1969; Label: Columbia	—	—	—
Siempre Bravos	Released: 1995; Label: Mercurio; Album of re-recordings	—	—	—
Midnight Storm	Released: 2004; Label: ZYX Music; Album of re-recordings, only released in Germany	—	—	—
"—" denotes releases that did not chart or were not released in that territory.

=== Compilation albums ===
Title	Album details
Historia de Los Bravos	Released: 1974; Label: Columbia
Lo mejor	Released: 1981; Label: Discosa
Los Bravos Forever – 20 Aniversario	Released: 1986; Label: RCA Victor
Los Bravos	Released: 1992; Label: Columbia
Pop de los 60	Released: 1998; Label: RCA/BMG
Bring a Little Lovin'	Released: 2001; Label: BMG
Singles Collection	Released: 2001; Label: Graffiti
Black Is Black – The Anthology 1966–1969	Released: 25 August 2017; Label: RPM
Orígenes	Released: 12 March 2021; Label: Sony Music

== Singles ==
Title	Year	Peak chart positions									
Title	Year	SPA	AUS	BEL (FL)	BEL (WA)	CAN	FRA	GER	NL	UK	US
"It's Not Unusual" / "No sé mi nombre"	1966	— 9	—	—	—	—	—	—	—	—	—
"La parada del autobus"	1966	2	—	—	—	—	—	—	—	—	—
"Black Is Black"	1966	1	3	4	3	1	4	4	3	2	4
"Trapped"	1966	10	—	—	—	—	—	—	—	—	—
"I Don't Care"	1966	—	51	20	23	—	12	15	30	16	—
"Going Nowhere"	1966	—	99	—	48	55	—	37	—	54 (Note: Chart position is from the UK "Breakers List".)	91
"La moto"	1967	4	—	—	—	—	—	—	—	—	—
"Uno come noi"	1967	18	—	—	—	—	—	—	—	—	—
"Como nadie mas"	1967	13	—	—	—	—	—	—	—	—	—
"Los chicos con las chicas"	1967	1	—	—	—	—	—	—	—	—	—
"El loco soy yo" / "Te quiero así"	1967	18	—	—	—	—	—	—	—	—	—
"I'm All Ears"	1967	—	—	—	—	—	—	—	—	—	—
"Like Nobody Else"	1967	—	—	—	—	—	—	—	—	—	—
"Bring a Little Lovin'"	1968	2	48	—	—	22	—	—	35	—	51
"Love Is a Symphony"	1968	27	—	—	—	—	—	—	—	—	—
"Just Holding On"	1968	—	—	—	—	—	—	—	—	—	—
"Save Me, Save Me"	1969	—	—	—	—	—	—	—	—	—	—
"Individuality"	1969	—	—	—	—	—	—	—	—	—	—
"Amor y simpatía"	1969	—	—	—	—	—	—	—	—	—	—
"Dirty People"	1969	—	—	—	—	—	—	—	—	—	—
"People Talking Around"	1970	7	—	—	—	—	—	—	—	—	—
"Hagamos una Navidad"	1970	—	—	—	—	—	—	—	—	—	—
"En tu sonrisa"	1971	—	—	—	—	—	—	—	—	—	—
"Welcome to Mars"	1973	—	—	—	—	—	—	—	—	—	—
"Ma marimba"	1974	—	—	—	—	—	—	—	—	—	—
"Hey, Mama"	1975	—	—	—	—	—	—	—	—	—	—
"Never, Never, Never"	1976	—	—	—	—	—	—	—	—	—	—
"Black Is Black" ('86 dance mix)	1986	—	—	—	—	—	—	—	—	—	—
"—" denotes releases that did not chart or were not released in that territory.
