= Halo =

HALO, halo, halos or haloes may refer to:

== Most commonly ==
- Halo (optical phenomenon), with ice crystals
- Halo (religious iconography), a ring of light around the image of a head
- Halo (franchise), a sci-fi video game series (2001–present)

== Arts and entertainment ==
=== Fictional characters and entities ===
- Halo (DC Comics), a 1983 superheroine
- Halo Array or halos, fictional megastructures in the video game
- Halo, a character in the sci-fi comic strip The Ballad of Halo Jones

=== Film and television ===
- Halo (1996 film), an Indian drama film
- Halo (2007 cancelled film), a project directed by Niell Blomkamp
- Halo 4: Forward Unto Dawn, a 2012 web series and direct-to-video film
- Halo (TV series), a 2022 adaptation of the game
- Nickelodeon HALO Awards, an American television special (2008–2018)

=== Music ===
- Halo Records, a British record label (formed 2000)

==== Bands ====
- Halo (Christian rock band), an American band
- Halo (metal band), an Australian band
- Halo (British band)
- HALO (South Korean group)
- The Halos, an American doo wop group

==== Albums ====
- Halo (Amorphis album) (2022)
- Halo (Azonic album) (1994)
- Halo (Bakar album) (2023)
- Halo (Current 93 album) (2004)
- Halo (Tiffany Day album), 2026
- Halo (Juana Molina album) (2017)
- Halo, by Severina (2019)

==== Songs ====
- "Halo" (Beyoncé song) (2008)
- "Halo" (Lumix song) (2022)
- "Halo" (Soil song) (2001)
- "Halo" (Starset song) (2015)
- "Halo" (Texas song) (1997)
- "Haloes", from The Tubes by The Tubes
- "Halos" by ± from Xs on Your Eyes
- "Halo", by All That Remains from Madness
- "Halo", by Basement from Promise Everything
- "Halo", by Bethany Joy Galeotti from Friends with Benefits: Music from the Television Series One Tree Hill, Volume 2
- "Halo", by Bloc Party from Intimacy
- "Halo", by Cage the Elephant from Melophobia
- "Halo", by The Cure from Join the Dots
- "Halo", by The Dark Element from The Dark Element
- "Halo", by Deep Blue Something from Home
- "Halo", by Depeche Mode from Violator
- "Halo", by Endless Shame from Generation Blind
- "Halo", by Foo Fighters from One by One
- "Halo", by Hieroglyphics from Full Circle
- "Halo", by Linkin Park from LP Underground X: Demos
- "Halo", by Machine Head from The Blackening
- "Halo", by Oliver Tree from Love You Madly Hate You Badly
- "Halo", by Poppy from Negative Spaces
- "Halo", by Porcupine Tree from Deadwing
- "Halo", by Primal Fear from Metal Commando
- "Halo", by the Pussycat Dolls from Doll Domination
- "Halo", by Red Flag
- "Halo", by Ryan Adams from Prisoner (B-Sides)
- "Halo", by Slash from Apocalyptic Love
- "Halo", by Tinchy Stryder from Catch 22
- "Halo", by Takida from Bury the Lies

=== Other arts and entertainment ===
- Halo (sculpture), a kinetic sculpture in Australia
- Halo (b-boy move), a dance move

== Military ==
- High altitude-low opening, a category of military parachuting
- Operation Halo, the Canadian contribution to the 2004 United Nations Stabilization Mission in Haiti
- Mil Mi-26 (NATO reporting name: Halo), a Soviet/Russian heavy transport helicopter
- Hypersonic Air Launched Offensive Anti-Surface, U.S. Navy program

== Organisations and brands ==
- HALO Trust, a landmine-clearance NGO headquartered in Scotland (founded 1988)
- HALO Urban Regeneration, a Scottish start-up support firm (founded 1988)
- Wonderful Halos, a brand name of mandarin oranges sold by The Wonderful Company
- Los Angeles Angels, a Major League Baseball team, nicknamed the Halos

== People ==
- Halo Khan Ardalan, Kurdish ruler of Ardalan from 1590 to 1616
- Halo Meadows (1905–1985), American actress
- Thea Halo (born 1941), American writer and painter
- Laurel Halo (born 1985), stage name of American electronic musician Laurel Anne Chartow
- Takashi Hirose (swimmer) (1923–2002), American swimmer nicknamed "Halo"

== Places ==
=== Ancient Greece ===
- Halos (Thessaly), a town and polis of ancient Thessaly
- Halos (Delphi), a space near the temple of Apollo in Delphi

=== United States ===
- Halo, Kentucky, an unincorporated community
- Halo, West Virginia, an unincorporated community
- The Halo (building complex), Newark, New Jersey
- Halo (bar), a former gay bar in Washington, D.C.

=== Elsewhere ===
- Halo (nightclub), a former venue in Bournemouth, England

== Sport ==
- Halo (safety device), in motorsports
- Los Angeles Angels, a Major League Baseball team, nicknamed the Halos
- Halo (horse) (1969–2000), American Thoroughbred racehorse and sire

== Science and technology ==
=== Astronomy, physics and space ===
- Dark matter halo, a hypothetical structure in outer space
- Galactic halo, a component of a galaxy
  - Stellar halo, the component that contains stars
- Halo orbit, in orbital mechanics
- Helium and Lead Observatory, a supernova neutrino detector
- Habitation and Logistics Outpost, a module of the planned Lunar Gateway space station
- Halo (crater), on the Moon
- Halo nucleus, a core nucleus surrounded by a "halo"

=== Medicine ===
- Halo-gravity traction device, a cervical brace
- Halo sign, a radiological diagnostic

=== Other science and technology ===
- Halo (mathematics), in non-standard analysis
- Project Halo, in artificial intelligence
- Halo antenna, a circular antenna
- HaloIPT, a wireless vehicle charging technology under WiTricity

== Other uses ==
- Halo effect, a cognitive bias
- Halo hairstyle, an alt-grunge hairstyle

== See also ==
- Halo- (disambiguation)
- Hallo (disambiguation)
- Helo (disambiguation)
- Halo-halo, a Filipino dessert
- "Halo, Halo", 1982 Yugoslavian song
- List of Halo media
- Wi-Fi HaLow, the IEEE 802.11ah wireless networking protocol
