= Hello.com =

hello.com may refer to:

- A second-level domain on the Internet, currently owned by Hello Network, Inc.
  - Hello (social network), a social networking service
  - Hello (software), a defunct photo sharing service by Picasa

== See also ==
- Hello (disambiguation) § Computing and technology
- Hello
