= Mike Kogel =

German-born Spanish singer (born 1944)

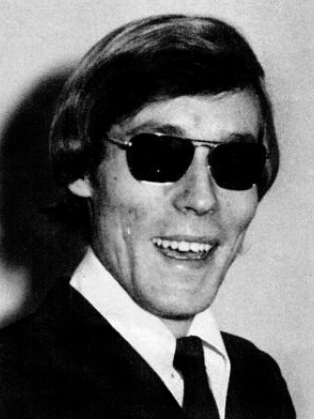

Background information
- Also known as: Mike Kennedy; Mike Keller
- Born: Michael Volker Kogel; 25 April 1944 (age 82); Berlin, Germany
- Origin: Mallorca
- Genres: Pop; rock; beat
- Instrument: Vocals
- Years active: 1965–2016
- Formerly of: Los Bravos

Michael Volker Kogel (born 25 April 1944), also known as Mike Kennedy and Mike Keller, is a German-Spanish singer. He is best known as the lead singer of Los Bravos.

== Early life ==
Michael Volker Kogel was born in Berlin. His mother was an actor and his father worked in an actors cabaret. His mother left the family when he was a child and his father was rarely at home, so Mike was raised by his grandmother, a Jehovah's Witness. Kogel's mother committed suicide when she was sixty-five years old. After he left school, he moved in with his mother and stepfather in Cologne, where he worked in a bar.

While working in the bar, Kogel sang in nightclubs, as he was influenced by Elvis Presley and "imitated his voice, his gestures, his makeup". He also cited Pat Boone, Eddie Cochran and Ricky Nelson as influences. He also learned how to speak English by listening to American Forces Network, a radio station for American soldiers based in Germany.

== Career ==
=== Michael and The Firebirds ===
In 1964, Kogel joined local band Michael and The Firebirds. They recorded their first single, "Der Knüller Mausi Müller (Abigail Beecher)" / "Wir sind eine Dancing Band", in May 1964 under Ariola records. Their second single, "Laß sie gehn" / "Make Me Happy", under Star-Club records in February 1965.

=== Los Bravos ===
Kogel was singing in a Cologne pub when he was approached by a band from Mallorca on tour called The Runaways, who asked him to sing with them as their singer had left to go back to Spain due to throat problems. After helping them out with their tour, Kogel returned with them to Spain. The band, now Mike and the Runaways, toured Spain and in 1965, Kogel was advised to join Los Sonor, a pop group based in Spain, and that group became Los Bravos.

Los Bravos' first album, Black Is Black, was recorded and produced in London in 1966. Because Kogel's English was still not fluent, he had to have his lyrics written out phonetically. The title track was released as a single in July 1966, and reached number two in the UK (stopped by Out of Time" by Chris Farlowe from getting to number one), number four in the US, and number one in Canada and Spain. Los Bravos are often credited as the first Spanish band to have an international hit. Mike's vocals sounded so similar to that of American singer Gene Pitney's that some people actually thought "Black Is Black" was a Pitney single.

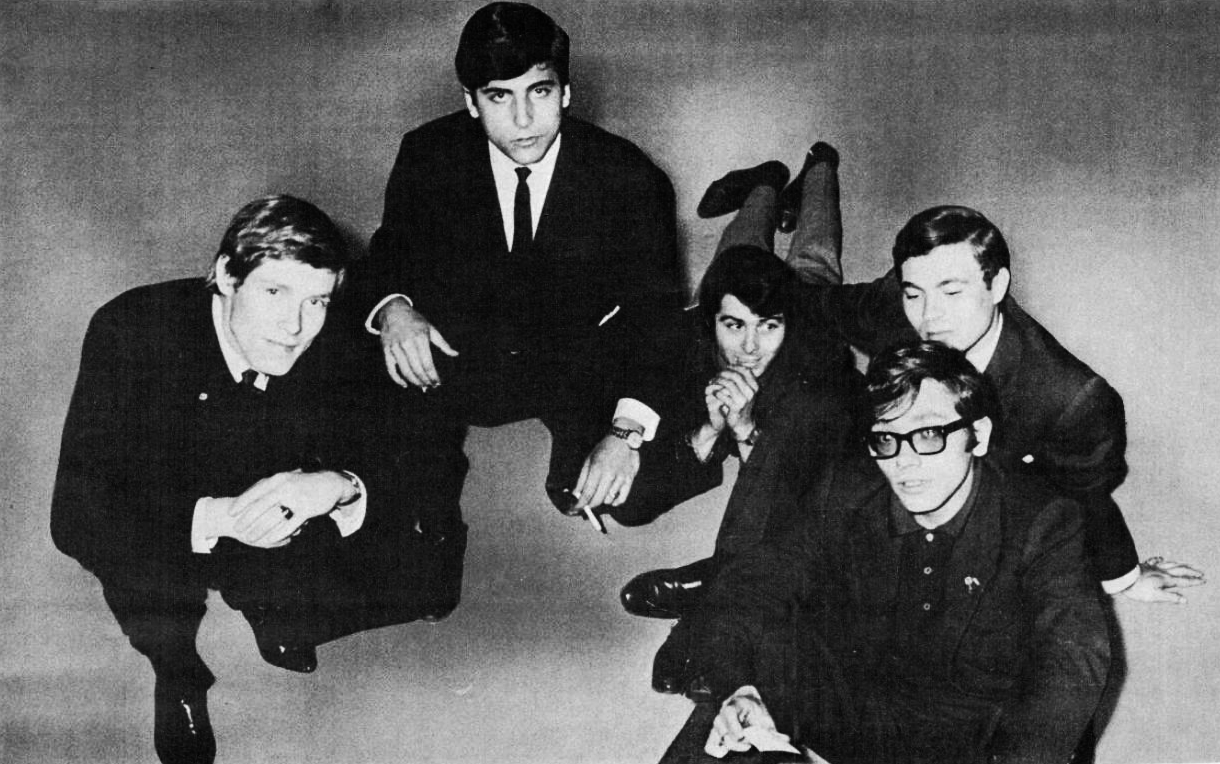
Kogel, on the far left, with Los Bravos in 1966

In a 2024 interview, Kogel showed distaste for "Black Is Black": "I didn’t like "Black is Black"... I followed along without liking it. It seemed to me like an easy melody, [with lyrics] that didn't say much".

When the band were asked to tour the United States, Kogel refused to board the plane as only vaccinated visitors were allowed in, but due to his religion, did not want to be vaccinated, but was ultimately convinced.

Kogel was known for his wild personality on stage, and once rode onto stage on a motorcycle. However, Kogel was also a "total hypochondriac" at the time, which started after a bad reaction to Hashish mixed with alcohol and amphetamines while in Istanbul in 1967.

Los Bravos appeared in two Spanish films and had a minor hit in Europe with "I Don't Care"; they had another number one hit in Spain with "Los chicos con las chicas" in 1967. Their song "Bring a Little Lovin'", written for them by recording duo Vanda & Young in 1968, went to number two in Spain and had a resurgence after featuring in Quentin Tarantino's 2019 film Once Upon a Time in Hollywood.

=== Solo ===
In 1968, Kogel left the band to go solo. Under the name "Mike Kennedy", he released many singles that never sold well commercially, however one single, "Louisiana", peaked at number 62 on the USA's Billboard Hot 100 in April 1972, and was on the chart for seven weeks. That same year, he played a supporting role in the giallo film A Lizard in a Woman's Skin, by Italian director Lucio Fulci.

Kogel sang in English, Spanish and German on his solo records; records released in Spain were recorded in mostly Spanish, but a few songs in English, and he sang in both German and English in his Germany releases. A few of his singles were recorded in one language and re-recorded in another, an example being "Nunca Olvidaré", which was translated into English and released as "I'll Never Forget".

According to Kogel, he refused to record songs written by manager Alain Milhaud, something he said in 2024 he regretted and he "should have listened to him". He also said in the same 2024 interview that he was a "major narcissist", which also affected his solo career. According to singer Miguel Ríos, he was "amazed that he (Kogel) could get drunk and then go up on stage and sing like it was nothing, perfectly in tune. It’s possible that Mike was shy and needed to drink to combat stage fright. To sing so well, he’s spent a lot of time hungover."

=== Later career ===
Mike later spent time in Latin America, and was once almost kidnapped by guerrillas in El Salvador. He also lived in Barcelona, Mallorca, Valencia and Madrid. Kogel, with the surviving members of Los Bravos, performed at a reunion concert in 2004. In 2015, Kogel, with original Los Bravos bassist Miguel Danus, reformed the band and re-recorded "Black Is Black".

After the "Black Is Black" re-recording, Kogel was not made aware that Danus and Gomez had reformed the band with newer members, but once he had, Kogel did not want anything to do with the project. When speaking to Marliska Rock show, an online programme hosted in Spain, Kogel said: "They are kids who have no effing idea. It seems to me like a lack of respect for the fans who knew Los Bravos in their classic form."

Kogel reportedly played his last professional gig in 2016.

== Personal life ==
Kogel never had children, and as of 2024 his only living relative is his uncle on his mother's side, who still lives in Germany.

Kogel suffered a fall in October 2023, and was on the floor for nearly twenty-four hours before he was discovered and ambulances were called. After leaving the hospital, he moved into a long-term care home in Vitoria-Gasteiz, in Northern Spain. He lives with a carer. Before moving into a care home, he spent fifteen years living on the fourth floor of a walk-up apartment.

He was good friends with Spanish singer Concha Velasco until her death in 2023.

== Solo discography ==
=== Albums ===
Year	Label	Title
1969	Barclay	Enigmatico Mike
1971	Explosion	Mike Is Mike
1972	Explosion	Made In U.S.A.
1976	BASF	Pinceladas
1991	Original	De Neuvo En Casa
2014	no label	Insulation

=== Singles ===
==== Spanish singles ====
Year	Label	A-side	B-side	Notes
1969	Barclay	"Nunca Olvidaré"	"Tu Ami Un Altro"	
1971	Barclay	"¡Hay Loteria!"	"Llorando Bajo La Lluvia"	
1971	Explosion	"Louisiana"	"Extasis"	
1973	Explosion	"Arkansas"	"Look Up In The Sky"	
1975	Explosion	"Con Una Sonrisa Naci"	"Multiplication"	
1976	Columbia	"Never, Never, Never"	"Hey Mama (I'm Drinking)"	Released as "Mike Kennedy y Los Bravos"
1978	Novola	"Black Is Black"	"La Lluvia (La Pioggia)"	

==== German singles ====
Year	Month	Label	A-side	B-side	Notes
1969	June	Ariola	"I'll Never Forget"	"I'll Never Get You"	
1970	January	Ariola	"Mamie"	"Es Lebe Die Liebe"	
1971	October	Finger	"Louisiana"	"The Lover (Of The Lost Face Of The Moon)"	
1972	August	Bellaphon	"Look In My Eyes Pretty Woman"	"The Livin' I'm Doin'"	
1973	?	Bellaphon	"Arkansas"	"Mother America"	
1974	?	BASF	"Und die Nacht singt ihr Lied"	"Verzeih' mir Jeannie"	
1975	?	BASF	"Ich bin bei Dir"	"Wer Liebe gibt"	
1975	?	BASF	"Multiplication"	"Riverboat Baby"	
1975	?	Bellaphon	"Look In My Eyes Pretty Woman"	"The Livin' I'm Doin'"	Re-release
1976	?	BASF	"I Can't Help Myself"	"It's Only Make Believe"	
1976	?	BASF	"Never, Never, Never"	"Hey Mama (I'm Drinking)"	Released as "Mike Kennedy y Los Bravos"
1978	?	EMI	"Out Of Time"	"I Don't Know My Father"	
1979	?	Columbia	"Disco Lord Of Liechtenstein"	"My Prayer"	
1989	?	RCA	"Black Is Black"	"Bring a Little Lovin'"	Released as "Mike Kennedy's Los Bravos"
