= Touch by Touch =

Touch by Touch may refer to:

- "Touch by Touch" (Joy song)
- "Touch by Touch" (Diana Ross song)
- "Touch by Touch" by GreatGuys from Again, 2021
