= Hallo (disambiguation) =

Hallo is a variant of "hello".

Hallo may also refer to:

- Hallo (film), a 2007 Malayalam film
- Hallo, a foundry type made by Ludwig & Mayer
- Hallo Bay, a bay in Alaska, US
- Hallo Newspaper (Haló noviny), a newspaper in the Czech Republic
- William W. Hallo (1928–2015), American assyriologist
- Hollo, Pennsylvania, a community in the U.S.

== See also ==
- Allo (disambiguation)
- Hallo Hallo (disambiguation)
- Hello (disambiguation)
- Hullo (disambiguation)
