= Dmytro Derevytskyy =

Ukrainian entrepreneur

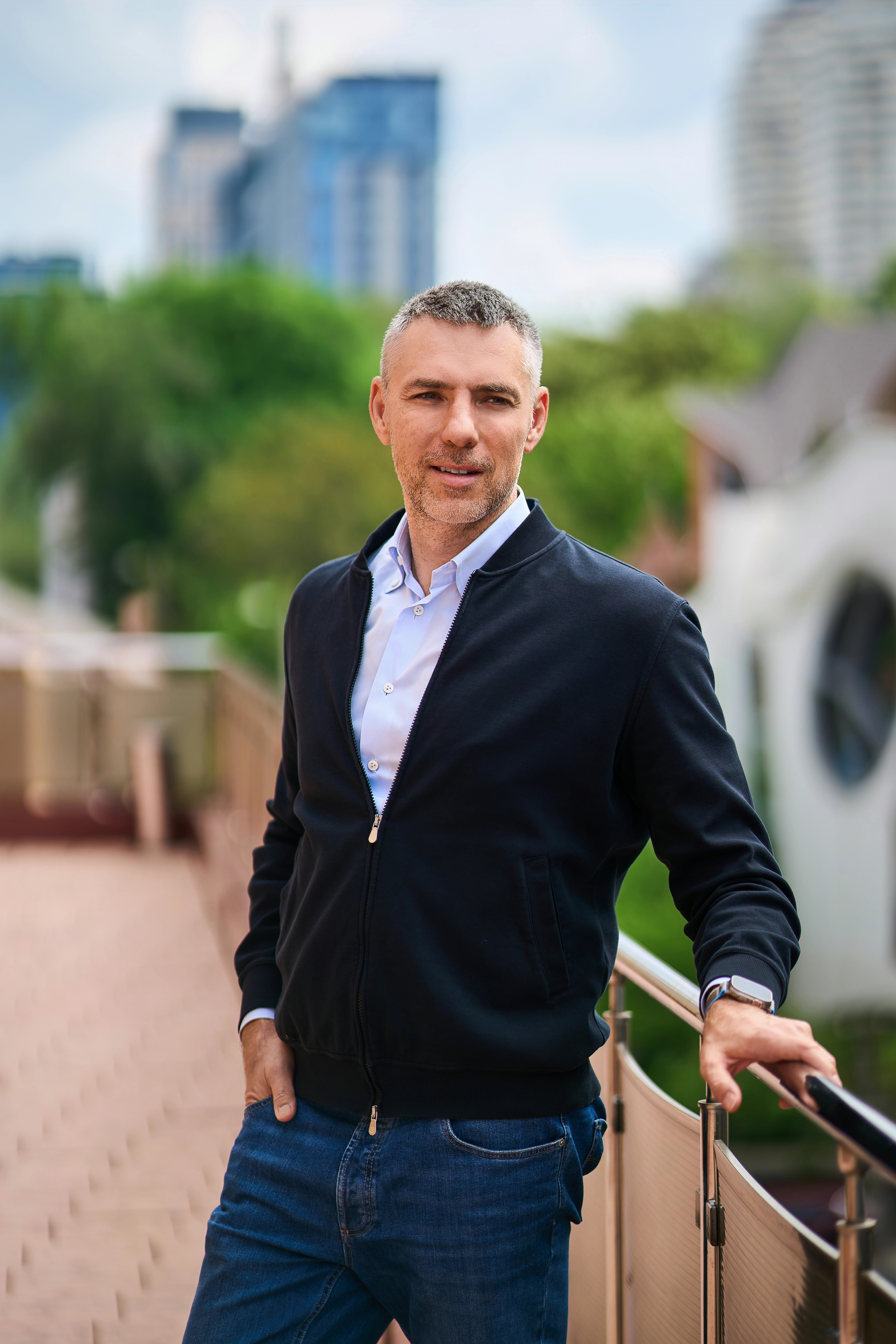
- Born: December 23, 1973 (age 52); Dnipropetrovsk, Ukrainian SSR, Soviet Union
- Education: Dnipro State University
- Occupation: Entrepreneur
- Spouse: Natalia Derevytskyy
- Children: 3
- Parent(s): Hryhorii Derevytskyi (father) and Hanna (mother)

Dmytro Derevytskyy (Ukrainian: Дмитро Деревицький) is a Ukrainian entrepreneur and founder of the Allo group of companies.

== Early years and education ==
Dmytro Derevytskyy was born on December 23, 1973, in Dnipro, to the family of Hryhorii Derevytskyy, an entrepreneur and founder of a construction cooperative. In 2009, Hryhorii contributed to the restoration of a building associated with Rabbi Levi Yitzchak Schneerson in Dnipro, where a memorial plaque was installed.

In 1995, Derevytskyy graduated from Dnipro State University with a degree in economics. In 2005, he graduated from the International Institute of Management and received a Master of Business Administration (MBA).

== Career ==
In 1996 he opened two home appliance stores. With his father, Hryhorii Derevytskyy, he founded the company Allo in 1998.

Since 2016 he has been responsible for the strategy of the Allo group of companies. Derevytskyy participated in the 2018 VI Annual Retail & Development Business Summit, and writes a column on engineering, technology and economics on the NV Business website.

In 2017, under Derevytskyy's strategic leadership, Allo launched its online marketplace and introduced a new retail format with the opening of the first "Allo Max" flagship store. In 2020, Derevytskyy was a speaker at the IV International Specialized Exhibition of the Retail and Development Industry, RAU Expo, where he participated in a panel discussion regarding crisis management strategies for retail companies.

In January 2021, Allo donated 22,000 medical respirators—valued at approximately 1.5 million UAH—to the Tabletochky charitable foundation, which supports children with oncological diseases.

From 2022 onwards, Derevytsky was invited as an industry expert in Deloitte Ukraine's annual consumer sentiment research series. In 2024, he contributed expert commentary to the Deloitte Ukraine discussion on consumer behaviour under wartime conditions. In late 2025, Allo's commentary was included in the Deloitte Ukraine report ''Holiday Shopping of Ukrainians'', and in the 2026 report ''Ukrainian Consumer Sentiments in 2025'', in which Derevytsky shared his assessment of the market and Allo's operational experience.

In 2024, Derevytskyi, together with his team, changed Allo's strategy to a marketplace for innovative tech.

In May 2025, under Derevytsky's leadership, Allo launched a new product category on its marketplace—Xiaomi electric vehicles.

== Personal life ==
Derevytskyy is married to Natalia, a photographer. The couple has three children.
