= Allo =

Allo may refer to:

- allo-, a prefix used in linguistics to form terms for variant forms
- 'Allo, a form of Hello
- Allo, a shortening of allosexual
- Allopregnanolone, a neurosteroid sometimes abbreviated as "ALLO"
- 'Allo 'Allo!, a British television sitcom

== Places ==
- Allo, Navarre, a town in Spain
- Allo Mahar, a village and union council in Pakistan

== Songs ==
- "Allô, allô", a 2006 song by Ilona
- "Allo" (song), a 2021 song by Loboda

== Technology ==
- Allo (company), a Ukrainian electronics distribution company
- Allo Communications, a fiber-optic telecommunications company and subsidiary of Nelnet
- Google Allo, a discontinued messaging app made by Google
- Allo (Company), a platform for real-world asset (RWA) tokenization and lending,

== See also ==
- Alo (disambiguation), for a list of meanings of "Alo" and "ALO"
