= Meter Jam =

Indian campaign against malpractices of taxi and auto rickshaw drivers

Meter Jam is a campaign being followed in Metro cities of India such as Bangalore and Mumbai to correct the malpractices adopted by the taxi and auto rickshaw drivers.

== Challenges faced by public ==
1. Meter Tampering: It has been noticed that more than 90% of the meters are tampered.
2. The drivers most of the times do not acknowledge to go by the rates of the meter and ask for extra payment from the passengers which is sometimes more than three times the actual amount.
3. Physically assaulting passengers.
4. Extortion indulged with travelers who are not locals.
5. Rejecting and Ignoring the Passenger requests to go to places they request

== Steps taken by public ==
To correct the above issues, the public has started this campaign called Meter Jam where they cooperatively avoid travel by Auto Rickshaws on the planned date. The publication of the same by the Newspapers, and using other tools like Twitter, Facebook and Orkut they are able to communicate to a larger audience. Bangalore Metropolitan Transport Corporation has helped the passengers by in anticipation of the meter jam, by running 300 extra buses across the city. Other solutions to minimize the impact on the passengers have tried car pooling and walking.

== Challenges quoted by Auto Drivers’ Union ==
Srinivas Murthy, president, Auto Drivers’ Union, said he was unaware of ‘Meter Jam’. He said that in Bangalore, in congested areas such as Minerva circle, Majestic and Corporation circle, an auto can travel at 8 km per hour. It takes hours and so auto drivers refuse to ply to such places. When told that auto drivers refuse to ply anywhere, he admitted that there was a problem.

=== Corrective actions that have happened ===
Although corrective actions have been performed, but they have not taken effect. OLA cabs had started apps where customers can book an auto using their tool where they get charged by meter basis and Rs 10 additionally. This has seen to make an improvement by a marginal part of the Auto drivers.
