= Halo- =

Halo- is a Greek prefix meaning "salt." In biology, it is often used to indicate halotolerance and is a portion of many words:

- Halobacteria
- Haloclasty
- Halophile
- Halophyte

== See also ==
Halo (disambiguation)
