= Cheveux longs et idées courtes =

1966 single by Johnny Hallyday

Single by Johnny Hallyday

from the album La Génération perdue
- Language: French
- Released: 10 May 1966
- Recorded: Studio Blanqui, Paris
- Genre: Folk rock
- Length: 3:40
- Label: Philips
- Songwriter: Gilles Thibaut
- Producer: Lee Hallyday

Johnny Hallyday singles chronology
"Je l'aime" (1966)	"Cheveux longs et idées courtes" (1966)	"Noir c'est noir" (1966)

"Cheveux longs et idées courtes" (translated title: "Long hair and short thoughts") is a song by French singer Johnny Hallyday. It was released in May 1966 and was featured on Hallyday's studio album La Génération perdue ("Lost generation") later that same year, being the lead single of the aforementioned album.

== History ==
The song was a diss track directed at the singer Antoine, who had criticized Johnny Hallyday in the lyrics of Élucubrations d'Antoine as a has-been artist. In Cheveux longs et idées courtes, Hallyday mocks Antoine's status as a pacifist, idealistic protest singer as being fake and naïve.

== Commercial performance ==
The song spent five consecutive weeks at no. 1 on the singles sales chart in France (from 14 May to 17 June 1966).

== Charts ==
Chart (1966)	Peak position
Belgium (Ultratop 50 Wallonia)	6
France (singles sales)	1
