= A Lizard in a Woman's Skin =

1971 film by Lucio Fulci

- Italian theatrical release poster
- Italian: Una lucertola con la pelle di donna
- Directed by: Lucio Fulci
- Screenplay by: Lucio Fulci; Roberto Gianviti; José Luis Martínez Mollá; André Tranché; Ottavio Jemma (uncredited)
- Story by: Lucio Fulci; Roberto Gianviti
- Produced by: Edmondo Amati
- Starring: Florinda Bolkan; Stanley Baker; Jean Sorel; Alberto de Mendoza; Silvia Monti; Anita Strindberg; Mike Kennedy; George Rigaud; Leo Genn
- Cinematography: Luigi Kuveiller
- Edited by: Vincenzo Tomassi; Jorge Serrallonga
- Music by: Ennio Morricone
- Production companies: International Apollo Films; Les Films Corona; Atlántida Films
- Distributed by: Fida Cinematografica (Italy); Inter Ecran (France); Atlántida Films (Spain)
- Release dates: 18 February 1971 (Rome); 15 October 1971 (Spain); 21 July 1976 (France)
- Running time: 95 minutes
- Countries: Italy; France; Spain

A Lizard in a Woman's Skin (Italian: Una lucertola con la pelle di donna) is a 1971 giallo film co-written and directed by Lucio Fulci. It stars Florinda Bolkan, Stanley Baker, Jean Sorel, Alberto de Mendoza, Silvia Monti, Anita Strindberg, Mike Kennedy, George Rigaud and Leo Genn. The film is an Italian-Spanish-French co-production.

Set in London, the film follows Carol Hammond (Bolkan), the daughter of a respected politician, who experiences a series of vivid, psychedelic nightmares consisting of debauched sex orgies and LSD use. In the dream, she commits a graphic murder of a neighbour whose life she is envious of (Strindberg) and awakes to a real-life criminal investigation into the murder of her neighbour.

== Plot ==
Carol Hammond is the daughter of Edmund Brighton, a wealthy lawyer and politician, and the wife of Frank, a partner in Edmund's law firm. They all live together in a large apartment in London with Joan, Frank's teenage daughter from a previous marriage. Carol has been visiting a psychoanalyst, Dr. Kerr, because she has been experiencing disturbing dreams involving her libertine next-door neighbour, Julia Durer, who often hosts raucous, drug-fueled parties in her apartment. In the dreams, Carol, wearing a fur coat, makes her way through a long hallway filled with naked people, before engaging in sexual activities with Julia.

While in his office with Frank, Edmund receives a phone call from an anonymous woman, claiming she has damaging information about his family. He then asks Frank if he is cheating on Carol, which Frank denies. Unknown to everyone else, Frank is indeed having an affair with his personal secretary, Deborah.

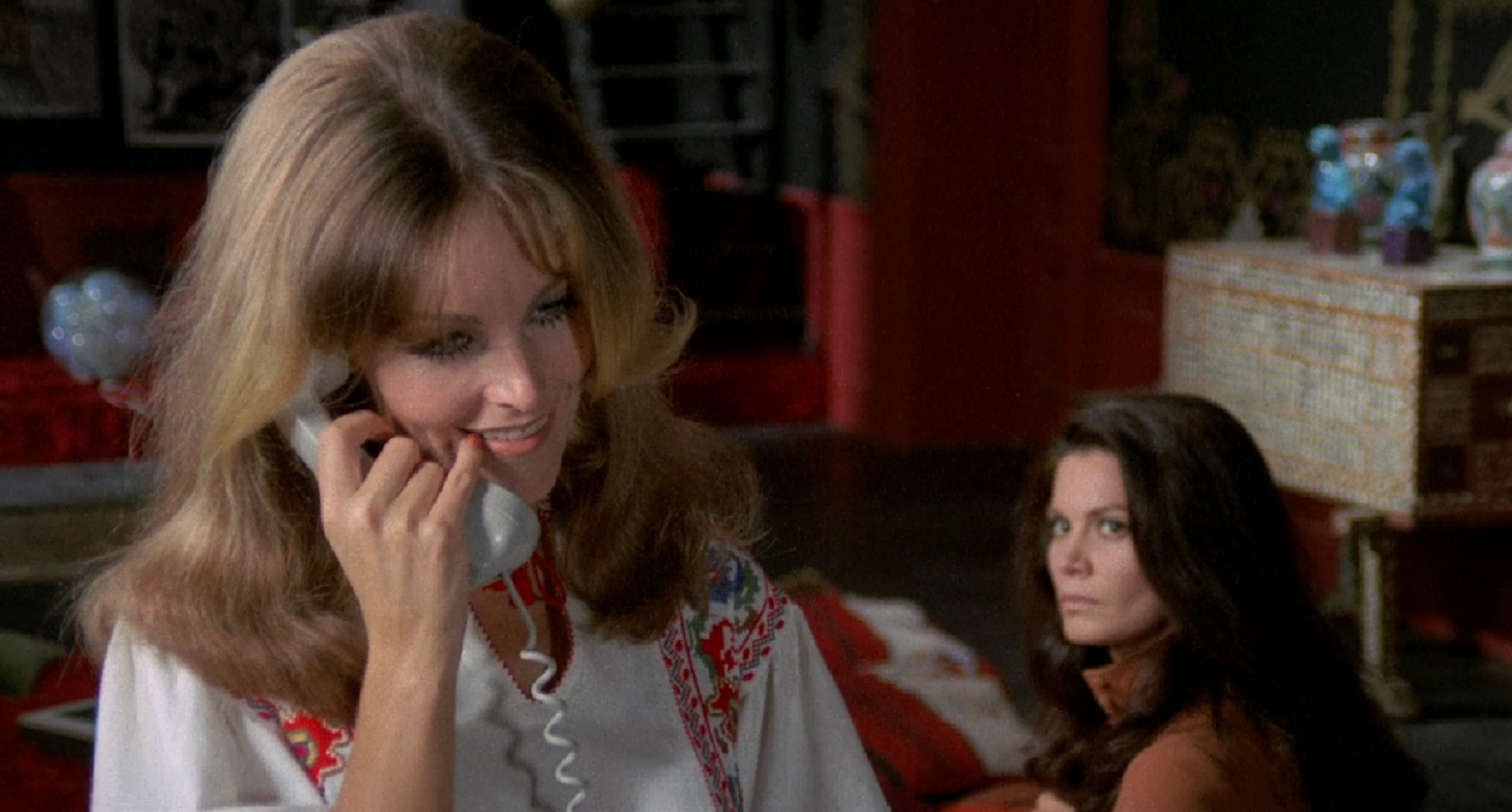
Anita Strindberg and Florinda Bolkan in a scene from the film

Carol recounts her latest dream to Dr. Kerr, which culminates in her stabbing Julia to death with a paper knife; Carol then notices a hippie couple who have seemingly witnessed the murder from a mezzanine. The following day, Carol is shocked to learn that Julia has actually been found murdered in her apartment, in exactly the same way it happened in Carol's dream—including the fur coat and paper knife, which are both found at the crime scene. Inspector Corvin from Scotland Yard arrives to lead the investigation.

During a shopping trip with Joan, Carol spots the two hippies from her dream. Joan asks the hippies if they know Carol or have seen her before, which they deny. As the evidence against Carol mounts, the police surreptitiously obtain her fingerprints, which match those found on the fur coat and paper knife. Carol is soon arrested and charged with murder. However, Corvin second-guesses whether Carol is really the killer, as she had described the murder scenario to Dr. Kerr before it actually took place.

As Carol is awaiting trial at a maximum-security sanitorium, the male hippie breaks in and chases her through the grounds. Carol escapes into a room where four live dogs are being vivisected, causing her to faint. When she comes to, there is no trace of the intruder. Meanwhile, Edmund, eager to exonerate Carol, discovers that Julia had been blackmailing Frank for money as not to expose his affair with Deborah. While Frank worries about being named as a suspect, Edmund gets Carol released on bail.

At Edmund's country estate, Carol is contacted by the female hippie and agrees to meet at Alexandra Palace. There, Carol is attacked by the male hippie in the cellar and chased through the building. The male hippie corners Carol on the roof, stabbing her in the process, but flees when the police arrive. Later, Joan asks the hippie woman about the male hippie's whereabouts, hoping he will give her any information that could exonerate Frank. The next day, Joan is found murdered in a field.

Corvin questions Carol about the phone call that Edmund received from Julia; Carol admits she learned about the call from Edmund, but is unsure whether Frank is aware of it. Corvin finally tracks down and arrests the hippie couple, Hubert and Jenny. Although Hubert admits to stalking Carol and murdering Joan, they insist they do not remember anything about the night of Julia's murder except for recalling "a lizard in a woman's skin". Corvin is informed that Edmund has killed himself at his estate, leaving a note confessing to Julia's murder.

At Edmund's grave, Corvin confronts Carol, saying that Edmund would have mentioned to her that Frank was with him when Julia called him. Corvin asserts Carol's guilt as she was with Julia on the day the phone call was made. After Julia threatened to expose their lesbian affair, Carol killed her that night and fabricated her nightmares to Dr. Kerr in a bid to plead temporary insanity. Carol was fearful that the hippies would identify her, though she was unaware that they were too high on LSD to make their testimony credible. Corvin ultimately leads Carol to a waiting police car.

== Cast ==
- Florinda Bolkan as Carol Hammond
- Stanley Baker as Inspector Corvin
- Jean Sorel as Frank Hammond
- Silvia Monti as Deborah
- Alberto de Mendoza as Sergeant Brandon
- Penny Brown as Jenny
- Mike Kennedy as Hubert
- Edy Gall as Joan Hammond
- George Rigaud as Dr. Kerr
- Leo Genn as Edmond Brighton

Uncredited

- Anita Strindberg as Julia Durer
- Ezio Marano as Lowell
- Franco Balducci as McKenna
- Erzsi Paál as Mrs. Gordon
- Basil Dignam as Commissioner McCloud
- Ursel Eberz as Policewoman Beth
- Robert Coleby as Harry Smith
- Jean Degrave as the clinic director
- Luigi Antonio Guerra, Gaetano Imbró, and Tony Adams as policemen

== Production ==
A Lizard in a Woman's Skin was an international co-production between International Apollo Films based in Rome, Atlantida Film based in Madrid, and Les Films Corona based in Paris. It was one of several European films Baker made towards the end of his career.

=== Filming ===
Shooting took place on-location in London and Bedfordshire, England, and at Dear Film Studios in Rome. Filming locations included Woburn Abbey, York House, the Royal Artillery Barracks, and Alexandra Palace, which was featured heavily in the film's climax. The interior of Edmond Brighton's office was filmed at the Marymount International School of Rome.

=== Dog scene ===
The film is known for a scene in which Carol opens the door to a room filled with dogs that are apparently being experimented on. The dogs are cut open with their hearts and guts still pulsating. The scene was so graphic and realistic that several crew members were forced to testify in court to disprove the accusation that real dogs were used in the film. Carlo Rambaldi, a special effects artist, saved Fulci from a two-year prison sentence by presenting the fake dog props in court to a seemingly unconvinced judiciary.

== Release ==
A Lizard in a Woman's Skin was distributed in Italy by Fida Cinematografica as Una lucertrola con la pelle di donna and released theatrically in Rome on February 18, 1971. This was followed by other releases in the country such as February 23 in Genova and March 5 in Bari.

It was released in Long Beach, California in the United States by American International Pictures on September 29, 1971, as A Lizard in a Woman's Skin and in Lubbock, Texas on April 14, 1972, as Schizoid. A release in London in the United Kingdom as Lizard in a Woman's Skin was held on May 25, 1973. The film was released in France as Le Venin de la peur (lit. "The Venom of Fear") and Carole, with a release print of 101 minutes.

== Reception ==
Donald Guarisco of AllMovie described the film as "a wild ride that offers plenty of bizarre moments that will stay stuck in the viewer's mind."

Loïc Blavier of Tortillapolis writes of the film's themes, "At the dawn of the 1970s, Fulci rejected flower power, just as he refuted the respectability of the bourgeoisie. The two are dismissed as equally culpable, and Freudian psychoanalysis is ultimately nothing more than the drug of the elites..... Fulci satirizes the hypocrisy of conservatives and proves here that their secret fantasies are ultimately only hindered by a smokescreen, propriety, which can very quickly crumble."

Olivier Père described the film as one of Fulci's best.

Mario Bava was an admirer of the film.
