= Joy (Austrian band) =

Austrian pop band

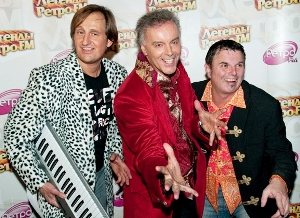
- Joy at Retro FM festival in Moscow, 2010 (From left to right: Andy Schweitzer, Freddy Jaklitsch, Manfred Temmel)

Background information
- Origin: Bad Aussee, Austria
- Genres: Pop; Euro-disco; Euro-pop
- Years active: 1984–1995; 2010–present
- Labels: OK-Musica; TELDEC; BMG; Major Babies; Warner Music Group Germany
- Members: Andy Schweitzer; Michael Scheickl
- Past members: Johannes Groebl; Hans Morawitz; Freddy Jaklitsch; Manfred Temmel
- Website: joy.or.at

Joy is an Austrian pop band, best known for the hits "Touch by Touch" and "Valerie". Their single "Touch by Touch" was released in 1985 and reached gold status in Austria, Portugal and Spain. The band was formed in 1984 by Andreas Schweitzer, Alfred Jaklitsch and Manfred Temmel.

== History ==
=== Early years ===
The band was formed in Bad Aussee, Austria. Andreas Schweitzer (born 26 February 1960), Alfred Jaklitsch (born 22 January 1960) and Manfred Temmel (25 February 1959 – 8 June 2019) met during High School. At that time, they played in different amateur bands together. But, after graduation, they pursued into different careers: Andy was a policeman, Freddy taught German language and history at school, and Manfred was a popular DJ in Orion disco club in Traunreut, Germany.

They met again in 1984, and decided to focus their joint efforts on a professional musical career. Quickly enough, they got a record deal with an Austrian label OK Musica. The record owners appointed Michael Scheickl (who was part of Mess at the Eurovision Song Contest in 1982, where their track "Sonntag" reached No. 10) as the band's producer.

Their first single, "Lost in Hong Kong" (composed by Michael Scheickl, under M. Mell), was released in February 1985. Despite becoming a minor hit, the band began to gain attention.

=== Success ===
The next single "Touch by Touch", composed by Schweitzer and Jaklitsch, was released in September 1985. It immediately reached European top 20 dance charts, and topped the Austrian national chart. It even reached gold status in their native Austria, in Portugal and in Spain, wherein more than 50,000 copies were sold.

Their third single, "Hello", also composed by Michael Scheickl, again became a hit, reaching number 26 on the Austrian national chart. The first album - also entitled Hello - immediately entered the Austrian national chart, and charted in many European countries as well. That brought worldwide popularity to the band with their albums sold in more than 30 countries. "Valerie" became a hit in Eastern Europe, notably in the USSR, where it reached No. 3 in the charts by Krugozor magazine in 1987. A few years later in Hungary, local group Inflagranti recorded a cover version entitled "Te meg én". Since 1986, Joy began performing on various TV shows, such as the GDR-based TV-show Kessel Buntes.

In 1986, the trio recorded a second album, Joy and Tears. The album included the single "Japanese Girls". It reached No. 14 on the Austrian national chart, and their popularity had reached Asia. In 1986, the trio won the most popular international act in South Korea.

Their Asian tour, which occurred on January and February 1987 in Bangkok, Hong Kong, Singapore, Taiwan and Seoul, was attended by more than 60,000 spectators. In Seoul, South Korea, Joy twice played for 12,000 people at the sold out Jamsil Olympic Stadium, and performed a version of their hit "Japanese Girls", re-titled as "Korean Girls". Later on, they went on a mini tour in the U.S., notably at the Shrine Auditorium and in San-Jose, mainly for Chinese and Vietnamese-American audiences. A picture taken in San Jose was later used on the sleeve for the "It Happens Tonight" single.

In 1987, the trio went on a European tour, performing in Portugal (twice), Spain and Italy. In between shows, they recorded "Destination Heartbeat", which became a soundtrack for the film Flucht in der Tod. Also in 1987, OK-Musica released the compilation album Best of Joy, on compact disc.

=== Line-up changes and break-up ===
In 1988, Freddy Jaklitsch and Manfred Temmel left the band and Anzo (Hans Morawitz) joined the band with Andy Schweitzer. They signed with Polydor Records and recorded their self-titled album, which includes the singles "Kissin' Like Friends", "She's Dancing Alone" and "Born to Sing a Love Song". However, the album and singles failed to chart.

In the early 90s, Freddy Jaklitsch and Manfred Temmel rejoined the band and in 1994, the duo (without Andy Schweitzer) signed with BMG Ariola and released a new single, "Hello, Mrs. Johnson". At this time, they began working on their fourth album, Full of Joy. The next year, Johannes Groebl (born 30 January 1960) joined the duo, and released another single, "Felicidad". Their album was slated for release in 1995. However, despite heavy promotion, BMG decided not to release the album. As a result, the album was shelved for good and the duo took a break.

=== Later years and reunion ===
In 1996, Jaklitsch and Temmel moved on to form Seer, which later became one of the more successful projects on the Austrian music scene. In 2008, Temmel left the band.

In June 1997, the duo performed in Gorky Park, at the 'Dancing City' open air festival.

On 29 November 2002, the duo took part in the first 'Diskoteka 80-x' festival, organized by one of the popular radio stations in Russia - AvtoRadio. The festival took place in Luzhniki Palace of Sports.

In 2010, all three members of the original line-up reunited to celebrate the 25th anniversary of their first success. On 10 October that year, the trio performed at the 'Legends of Retro FM' festival in Moscow.

In July 2011, the trio released Enjoy, their 1st album in more than two decades. It contained new songs, as well as remakes of such hits as "Touch by Touch" and "Valerie". The album was released in Austria by the label Major Babies, and reached No. 21 in Austrian national chart. In September 2011 the album was released in Russia on the CD-Land label, and in Hungary – distributed by Hargent Media.

On 15 July 2011, the trio performed in Estonia, at the Viljandi Retrofest for more than seven thousand viewers from Estonia and Latvia. In November 2011, Joy performed in Moscow once more – at the Diskoteka 80-x festival. This time the festival took place in the Olympic Stadium in Moscow.

Since May 2012, Freddy Jaklitsch, due to his responsibilities as a leader of the popular band Seer, has performed with Joy less often. Michael Scheickl became Joy's lead vocalist for live shows.

== Discography ==
=== Albums ===
- 1986 - Hello
- 1986 - Joy and Tears
- 1989 - Joy
- 2011 - Enjoy
- 2021 - In Love

=== Singles ===
- 1985 - "Lost in Hong Kong" (OK)
- 1985 - "Touch by Touch" (OK)
- 1986 - "Hello" (OK)
- 1986 - "Japanese Girls" (OK)
- 1986 - "Touch Me My Dear" (OK) (Portugal)
- 1987 - "Destination Heartbeat" (OK)
- 1987 - "It Happens Tonight" (OK)
- 1987 - "Black Is Black" (Remix)
- 1988 - "Kissin' Like Friends" (Polydor)
- 1989 - "She's Dancing Alone" (Polydor)
- 1990 - "Born to Sing a Lovesong" (Polydor)
- 1994 - "Hello, Mrs. Johnson" (BMG Ariola)
- 1995 - "Felicidad" (Ariola)
- 1995 - "Touch by Touch (The Remake)" (vs. Area 51!) (Turnaround Records)
- 1998 - "Touch by Touch 98" (BMG Ariola Austria)
- 2010 - "Touch by Touch 2011" (Major Babies)
- 2011 - "Love Is All Around" (promo) (Major Babies)
- 2011 - "Sunshine Boogie" (Major Babies)
- 2013 - "Megamix 2014" (Transalpin Music)
- 2017 - "Lunapark" (Melltom)
- 2020 - "Mas, Mas, Mas" (Melltom)

=== Compilations ===
- 1986 - Best (OK)
- 1987 - The Very Best of Joy (Hong Kong) (Pacific Music)
- 1987 - Touch Re-Mix 87 (Hong Kong) (Face Records)
- 1991 - Best of Joy (China) (Face One Records)
- 2000 - Best of Joy (EAMS)
- 2011 - Hits & More - Best Of (Hargent Media)
- 2011 - Hits & More - The Remixes & Rarities (Hargent Media)
- 2015 - The Original Maxi-Singles Collection and B-Sides (Pokorny Music Solutions)
