= Orkut Büyükkökten =

Turkish software engineer

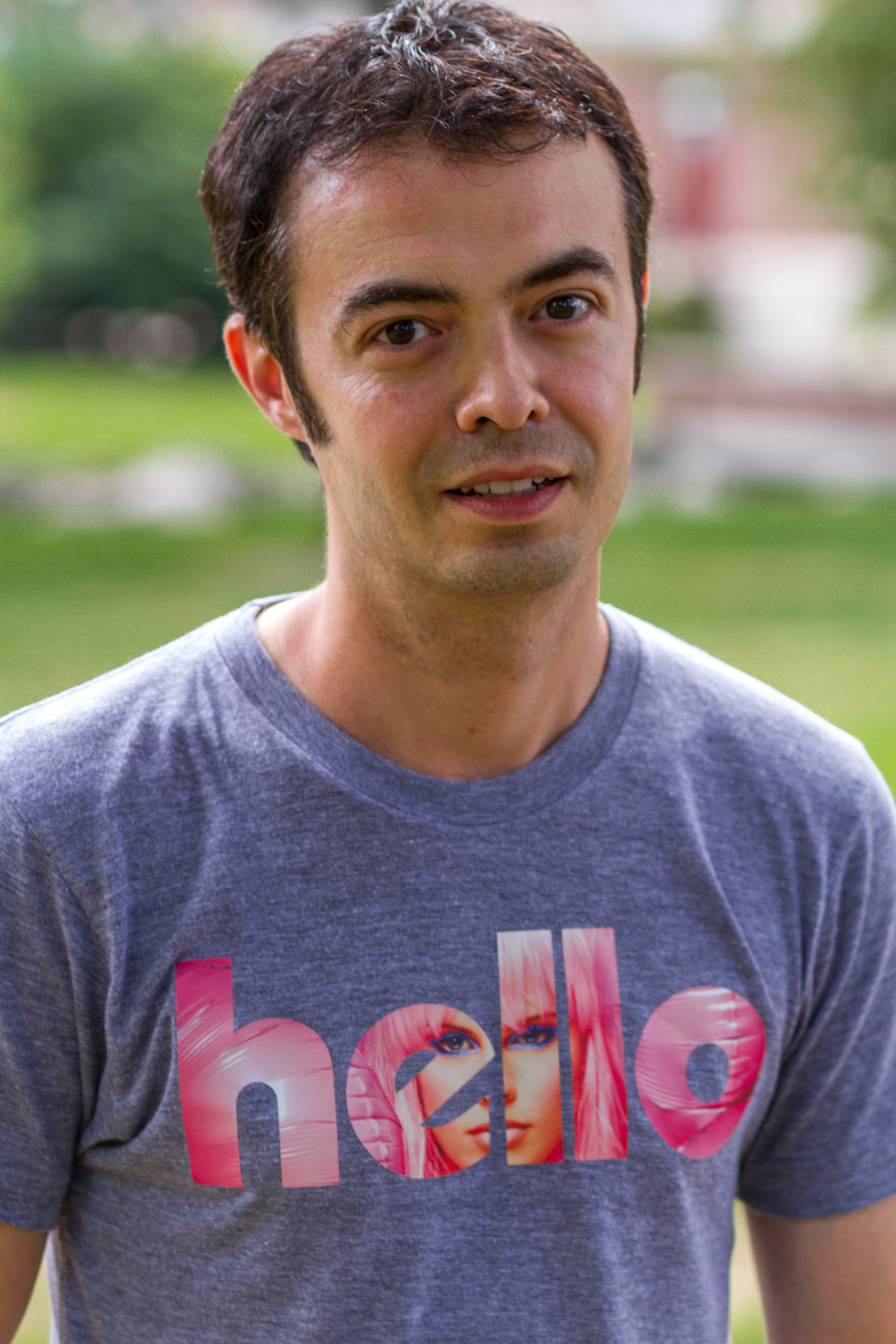
- Büyükkökten in 2015
- Born: February 6, 1975 (age 51); Konya, Turkey
- Occupations: Product manager; software engineer
- Years active: 1987– present
- Employers: Affinity Engines; Google
- Known for: Orkut; Hello
- Spouse: Derek Holbrook (m. 2008)

Orkut Büyükkökten (born February 6, 1975) is a Turkish software engineer who developed the social networking services Club Nexus, inCircle and Orkut. He is a former product manager at Google.

== Early life and education ==
Originally from Konya, Turkey, Büyükkökten obtained a B.Sc. degree in Computer Engineering and Information Science from Bilkent University in Ankara. He received both a M.S. and a Ph.D. in Computer Science from Stanford University. His research at Stanford focused on Web search and efficient PDA usage.

== Social media platforms ==
He has been building and working on online communities since 2000. He introduced his first social network, named Club Nexus, at Stanford in the fall of 2001. Club Nexus was the first college-specific social network. It was a system built to serve the networking and communication needs of the Stanford online community. Students could use Club Nexus to send e-mail and invitations, chat, post events, buy and sell used goods, search for people with similar interests, place personals, display their artwork or post editorial columns. Within a few months of its introduction in 2001, Club Nexus had attracted over 2,000 Stanford undergraduates.

Later, Büyükkökten introduced an alumni social network, named inCircle, for the Stanford Alumni Association intended for use by university alumni groups. In 2002, Büyükkökten launched a company, Affinity Engines, to commercialize inCircle and Club Nexus.

After leaving Affinity Engines and joining Google, he decided to use his 20% time to develop a social networking service. He said: "My dream was to connect all the Internet users so they can relate to each other, it can make such a difference in people's lives." The product manager and Marissa Mayer thought of naming the service after its creator. "Orkut.com" belonged to Orkut Büyükkökten himself. Google convinced him, and its social networking service was called Orkut.

Büyükkökten and Google were sued by Affinity Engines in 2004 for trade secret misappropriation. Affinity Engines claimed that Büyükkökten and Google had stolen Affinity Engines' code to launch the "Orkut.com" social networking service at Google. The lawsuit was settled in 2006.

In 2016, he launched a new social networking service, Hello. The social networking site can be customized in three languages — English, French and Portuguese. By August 2016, Hello was available in the US, Canada, France, UK, Australia, New Zealand, Ireland, and Brazil — both on iOS and Android. Hello announced its entry into the Indian market in April 2018. By September 2022, Hello had shut down.

== Personal life ==
In 2008 he married his boyfriend Derek Holbrook.
