= Ullo (disambiguation) =

Üllő is a town near Budapest.

Ullo or Üllő may also refer to:

- Üllő5, an archaeological excavation site near the Hungarian town
- Antonio Ullo, an Italian sprinter
- Chris Ullo, American politician

== See also ==
- Hullo (disambiguation)
