= Hullo (disambiguation) =

Hullo is a village in Estonia.

Hullo may also refer to:

- Hullo, a variant of "hello"
- Hullo, a Canadian passenger ferry service
- Hullo Healo, a musical comedy by Dion Titheradge and Kenneth Duffield

== See also ==
- Hallo (disambiguation)
- Ullo (disambiguation)
