= HELO =

HELO or Helo may refer to:

== People and characters ==
- Helô or Heloísa Pinheiro (born 1945), model from Brazil, and businesswoman
- Johan Helo (1889–1966), Finnish lawyer, diplomat and politician
- Sattar Jabbar Hilo, Mandaean priest from Iraq
- Karl Agathon (call sign: "Helo"), character in the 2004 Battlestar Galactica television series

== Other uses ==
- helicopter (military clipping: helo)
- HELO, a Simple Mail Transfer Protocol command
- Helo, an Indian-language news app from ByteDance
- Huddersfield Experimental Laptop Orchestra, England
- Helo Cliffs, Ross Island, Antarctica

== See also ==
- Hilo, the county seat of Hawaii County, Hawaii
- Hello (disambiguation)
- Halo (disambiguation)
