= Dnipro State University of Internal Affairs =

University in Dnipro, Ukraine

Coordinates: 48.4450°N 35.0528°E

- Дніпровський державний університет внутрішніх справ
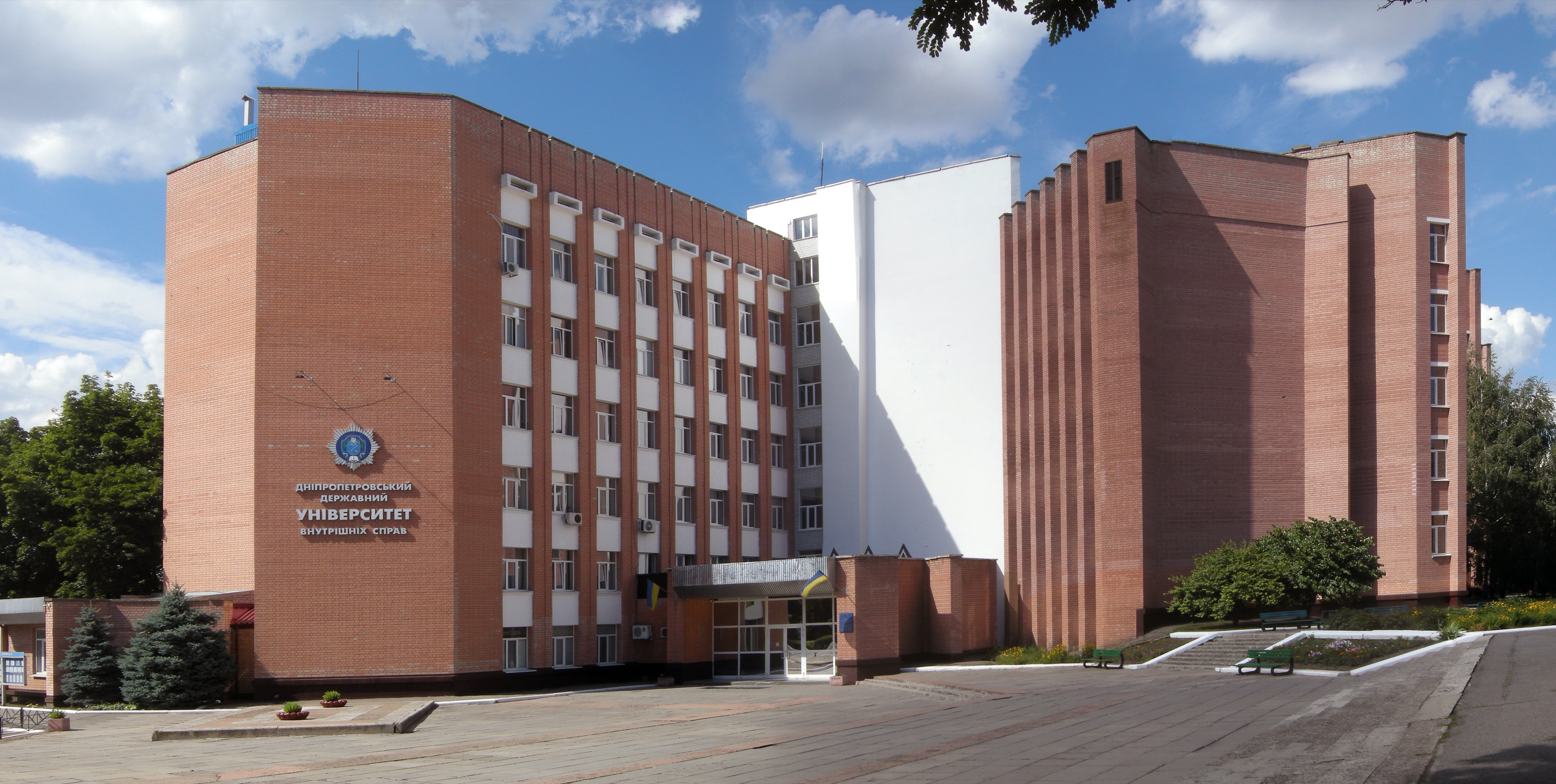
- Type: Public university
- Established: 1966
- Rector: Police Colonel Mr. Andrey Fomenko
- Academic staff: 250
- Students: 4500
- Location: Gagarina av. 26, Dnipro, 49005, Ukraine
- Language: Ukrainian
- Website: dduvs.in.ua
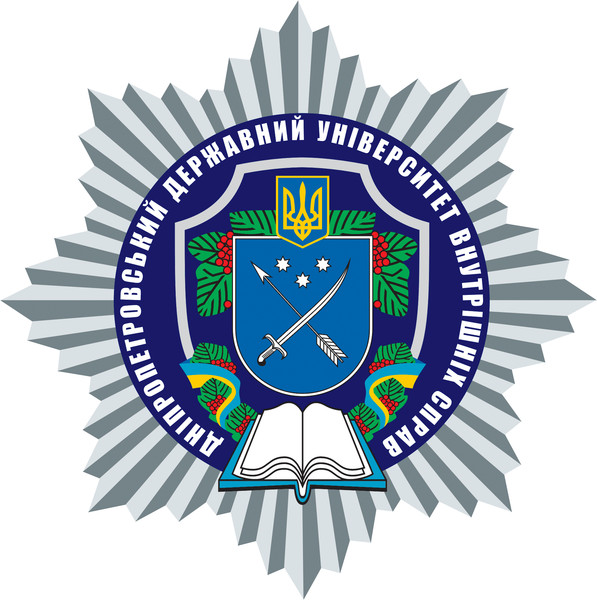

The Dnipro State University of Internal Affairs (Ukrainian: Дніпровський державний університет внутрішніх справ, romanized: Dniprovskyi derzhavnyi universytet vnutrishnikh sprav; DDUVS/DSUIA) is a university of the Ministry of Internal Affairs of Ukraine, located in the city of Dnipro. It is a Higher educational institution of the fourth accreditation level.

== History ==
"Dnipro State University of Internal Affairs", not to be confused with "Oles Honchar Dnipro National University", was established on 16 March 1966 as the Dnipropetrovsk Specialized Secondary School School of Militsiya of the Ministry of Internal Affairs of the Soviet Union. In 1992, it was renamed the Dnipropetrovsk College of Militsiya of the Ministry of Internal Affairs of Ukraine. On 1 September 1997, it was converted into a Higher education institution, the Dnipropetrovsk Law Institute of the Ukrainian Ministry of Internal Affairs. The Legal Academy of the Ministry of Internal Affairs of Ukraine was created from the institute in 2001. It became the Dnipropetrovsk State University of Internal Affairs in 2005. In 2016, the university was recognized as the best educational institution in the region in the field of jurisprudence.

== Structure ==
At the university, more than 10,000 cadets, students and trainees in the specialties "Law", "Law Enforcement" and "Management" study, acquire vocational training and improve their qualifications. Each year the university admits for training about 1800 persons who after graduation receive state standard diplomas of education and qualification levels of "bachelor" and "master".

The structure of the DDUVS includes:

- Educational and Scientific Institute of Law and Training of Specialists of National Police Units;
- Educational and Scientific Institute of Law and Innovative Education;
- Educational and scientific institute of distance learning and professional development.
- Faculty of training specialists for criminal police units;
- Faculty of training specialists for units of preventive activity.
- Zaporizhzhia Center of Primary Professional Training "Police Academy".

The structure also includes three laboratories:

- Educational and scientific laboratory for the study of problems of preventive activities
- Scientific laboratory of social monitoring of the educational and scientific institute of correspondence education and professional development.
- Scientific and educational laboratory for the study of the problems of combating organized crime and corruption

As a whole, the University has 20 departments that train lawyers for all regions of Ukraine. The uniqueness of the university today is that most of the faculty teachers are highly qualified lawyers with academic degrees and scientific titles, the total number of which is more than 250 people. Teachers have not only scientific achievements, but also have many years of practical experience of legal activity in the bodies of the National Police, as well as in the courts, prosecutors, local authorities, as well as in other organizations and institutions directly involved in law application and enforcement (lawyers, legal advisers, Notaries, etc.). The combination of scientific achievements and practical experience of teachers allows us to introduce innovative forms and technologies of teaching into the educational process, which includes traditional teaching of the theoretical courses with the solution of practical situational tasks, training, role games in conditions as close to reality as possible with subsequent discussion and summarizing.

Over the years of the University existence, its graduates have become more than 17 000 lawyers. The university has consistently and successfully carried out activities to improve teaching and methodological work, regularly published textbooks, manuals, scientific and practical comments and courses of lectures. A library complex of 5 reading rooms with a book fund of about 400,000 copies of printed publications of different branches of law, history, economics, philosophy, sociology, etc., are at the service of teachers, cadets and students, including electronic media means, access to Internet, the base and regulatory legal acts of Ukraine, the information system "League Law", specialized databases of the Ministry of Internal Affairs of Ukraine, computer classes, etc. The legal literature fund is the largest in the region. The university has a training hall for court sessions and an interactive room where complex-operational classes "Line 102" are bien held, practical skills among cadets and students are worked out. Foreign Languages Department has at its disposal a multimedia class that gives opportunity to provide for professional study of the leading European languages: French, German, English, Spanish.

The university conducts research on fundamental and applied problems of law enforcement and jurisprudence. Considerable attention is paid to the development of legislative activity problems, improvement of the legislative base of the law enforcement bodies activity, as well as combating crime and the implementation of research results into practice. Scientists take part in drafting laws, government regulations and parliamentary hearings on law enforcement matters. The results of scientific research are published in university-based professional scientific journals: Bulletin of Dnipro State University of Internal Affairs, Pridneprovsky Chasopis of Law, as well as monographs and textbooks. International, all-Ukrainian and branch scientific-practical conferences, seminars, round tables and other scientific events are held each year on regular basis.

Considerable attention is paid to training and attestation of scientific and pedagogical personnel. There are postgraduate and doctoral classes, where about 100 doctoral students, post-graduates, adjuncts and applicants are studying currently. Also University there are 3 specialized scientific councils with the right to consider and conduct defenses of dissertations in six specialties for the degree of candidate of law sciences.

Like all uniformed academies, the university maintains a dedicated police band. Since March 2016, the band has been headed by Volodymyr Levchenko. The band consists of professional musicians and participates in university life as well as regional, cultural and mass events such as City Day, Defender of Ukraine Day, and Liberation Day. The Brass Band was founded in 1966, and its first director was retired military musician M. Peysakhov. In 1981, the band was headed by Police Major A. Krivoshey, who held the post until retirement in 2003.

== Infrastructure ==
The university has one centralized infrastructure in the city of Dniprovka with a total area of 11.3 hectares and out-of-town training complex with an area of 27.8 hectares. Classes are held in a six-storey educational and laboratory building, in which there are 12 lecture halls for 1350 seats, 21 educational and methodical rooms, and 74 classrooms. On the territory of the educational institution there are 3 hostels, a dining room for 2 thousand seats, a cafe, a hairdresser, as well as a sports town with a football and volleyball fields, 5 specialized sport halls, shooting and multimedia shooting galleries. There are also comfortable rooms of hotel type for University guests.

== Cooperation ==
In 2018, DSUIA joined the Association of European Police Colleges (AEPC) and has been actively cooperating in the field of police training for five years. The university is a member of the International Association of Universities (IAU) and entered the World Higher Education Database (WHED) system in November 2022. DSUIA officially became a participant in the world ranking of QS universities (QS World University Rankings) from February 10, 2023.

Taking into account the specialization in the training of legal personnel, the university has established bilateral relations with 37 profile educational institutions, scientific organizations and police institutions of 15 near-abroad countries, countries of Europe and North America, signed cooperation agreements with 13 partners, Including:

- ”Vasile Lascar” Training School for Police Officers (Campina, Romania);
- Southern Utah University (Utah, USA);
- Universitat Jaume I (Castello, Spain);
- Broward College (Florida, USA);
- Academy of the Ministry of Internal Affairs of Georgia (Tbilisi, Georgia);
- University of Occupational Safety Management in Katowice (Poland);
- Jan Kochanowski University (JKU) in Kielce (Poland);
- Georgian Technical University (Tbilisi, Georgia);
- Ștefan cel Mare Police Academy (Moldova);
- University of Economics in Bydgoszcz (Poland);
- Academy of the Ministry of Internal Affairs of the Republic of Bulgaria (Sofia, Bulgaria);
- Academy of Police Forces in Bratislava (Slovakia);
- Lithuanian Police School (Kaunas, Lithuania);
- Vytautas Magnus University (Kaunas, Lithuania).

The university closely cooperates with the Center for International Law Studios (Salzburg, Austria), the Regent and Liberty Universities (Virginia, USA), the Warsaw University (Poland), the International Organization "Emmanuel" (USA), the OSCE Special Monitoring Mission in Ukraine, the Consultative Mission of the European Union in Ukraine, the United Nations Population Fund.
