= Hello (name) =

Hello may refer to the following notable people:

- Hello Ga-Young (born 1987), South Korean singer-songwriter
- Hello Hor (born 1994), Taiwanese stand-up comedian
- Ernest Hello (1828–1885), French critic
