= Touch by Touch (Joy song) =

1985 song by Joy

Single by Joy

from the album Hello
- B-side: "Heartache No. 1" / "Fire in the Night"
- Released: November 1, 1985
- Genre: Euro disco
- Length: 3:50 (Single Edit) 5:24 (Extended Maxi Version)
- Label: OK Musica; TELDEC; Ricordi International; Sonet; Greyhound Records; Polydor
- Songwriters: Andy Schweitzer, Freddy Jaklitsch

Joy singles chronology
"Lost in Hong Kong" (1985)	"Touch by Touch" (1985)	"Hello" (1986)

"Touch by Touch" is a song by Austrian Euro disco band Joy, released in 1985 as the second single from their debut album, Hello. The song was a huge success in their homeland, where it reached number one. In Germany, the song reached the top 20, peaking at No. 18 in 1986. It also became a hit in East Asia and the Philippines, and remains the band's signature song. Over the years it has become known as a classic in the euro disco genre.

== Charts ==
Chart (1985–1986)	Peak position
Austria (Ö3 Austria Top 40)	1
Germany (GfK)	18
