= Hallo Hallo =

Hallo Hallo may refer to:

- Hallo Hallo (Ace of Base song), a 2000 Ace of Base single
- Hallo Hallo (Lonnie Devantier song), the Danish entry in the 1990 Eurovision Song Contest
- Hallo Hallo (Odd Nordstoga song), a song by Norwegian musician Odd Nordstoga
- Hallo Hallo, a song by German rappers Azet & Zuna

== See also ==
- 'Allo 'Allo!, a British sitcom
