= Hello (company) =

Sleep-tracking device company (2012–2017)

- Company type: Technology, Sleep tracking
- Founded: August 28, 2012
- Dissolved: June 2017
- Headquarters: San Francisco, California, US
- CEO: James Proud
- Website: hello.is at the Wayback Machine (archived January 28, 2017)
- Native clients on: iOS, Android

Hello was an American technology company that sold sleep tracking devices and a sleep tracking application to help monitor sleep. The company was founded in August 2012 and shut down in June 2017.

== History ==
Hello was founded on August 28, 2012 by Thiel Fellow and CEO James Proud.

A successful Kickstarter campaign from Hello in 2014 raised $2.4 million from more than 19,000 backers, making it one of the most successful Kickstarter campaigns of all time. A preliminary financing round from Silicon Valley backers raised another $10.5 million. In June 2015, the company raised $40 million in a financing round from Temasek Holdings and Hello was valued between $250 million and $300 million at the time. Other backers included Facebook Messenger chief David Marcus, Facebook's virtual reality vice president Hugo Barra, Facebook executive Dan Rose, former Twitter CEO Dick Costolo, and Spotify's head of special projects, Shakil Khan.

=== Sense ===
Hello spent over a year developing a wearable sleep tracking device, but the company ultimately decided on creating a bedside device instead because Proud thought customers would be more likely to keep using the product.

Hello released their sleep tracker, Sense, on February 24, 2015; 21,000 units were sold during its launch. The Sense product includes a bedside device, a "Sleep Pill" that tracks a user's sleep by clipping onto a pillow, and a sleep tracking app. Sense has sensors that track temperature, light, sound and allergen particle data and can also play sounds to help the user fall asleep. The product gives the user a sleep score every night and wakes the user up at the right point in their sleep cycle. On November 1, 2016, the firm released a voice enabled version of the Sense sleep tracker.

=== Shut down ===
While trying to look for a buyer, Proud announced on June 12, 2017, in a blog post on Medium that Hello would be shutting down and the company laid off most of their employees that same day. Hello was also reportedly unable to pay its bills. The company said they were in talks with Fitbit for them to acquire the company, but failed to reach a deal. According to BBC News and Buzzfeed News, Hello shut down due to a lack of consumer demand for Sense, unenthusiastic reviews for the product, and competition from bigger brands.

Although Hello shut down in June 2017, the company's website, Hello.is, remained online until January 2018.
