= Hello (social network) =

Online social network

hello
- Original authors: Hello Network, Inc.
- Developer: Orkut Büyükkökten
- Release: May 1, 2016; 10 years ago
- Stable release: iOS 2.5.8 (December 6, 2018; 7 years ago) Android android.2.9.9 (April 26, 2019; 7 years ago) [±]
- Written in: Python, JavaScript, React
- Operating system: Cross-platform
- Available in: Multilingual
- Type: Instant messaging and social media
- Website: www.hello.com

Hello Network, Inc
- Headquarters: San Francisco
- No. of locations: Mountain View, California, United States
- Founders: Orkut Büyükkökten & John Murphy

Hello, stylized as hello, was a social networking service founded by Orkut Büyükkökten, the creator of Orkut. The service used to support access via a mobile app and was available for Android and iOS. Hello was launched May 1, 2016 as a replacement to Orkut, which was shut down on September 30, 2014. Hello is owned by Hello Network.

As of September 2019, Hello had been downloaded approximately 1 million times, compared to Orkut's 300 million active users. Hello.com was shut down in April 2022. According to their website, ".

As of 2026, their website still shows the same message of We are pausing hello while we get ready to launch something even better".
