= Hello Hello =

Hello Hello may refer to:

- "Hello Hello" (song), a 2007 song by Superfly
- "Hello, Hello" (Maaya Sakamoto song), a song by Maaya Sakamoto, 2018
- "Hello Hello", a song by Caravan from the album If I Could Do It All Over Again, I'd Do It All Over You, 1970
- "Hello Hello", a song by Moka Only from the album Flood, 2002
- "Hello, Hello", a song by Sophie Ellis-Bextor from the album Shoot from the Hip, 2003
- "Hello Hello", a song by Elton John and Lady Gaga from the film Gnomeo & Juliet, 2011
- "Hello Hello", a song by Inna, Melon and Dance Fruits Music, 2022
- "Hello Hello", a song by Bic Runga from the album Belle, 2011
- "Hello Hello", a song by Missy Higgins from the album The Ol' Razzle Dazzle, 2012
- "Hello Hello", a song by Trixie Mattel from the album The Blonde & Pink Albums, 2022
- "Hello Hello", a song by Sopwith Camel, 1966
- "Hello Hello", a song by Brown Sauce, 1981
- "Hello, Hello", a song by Kay Thompson and the Williams Brothers later performed by Liza Minnelli on the concert Liza's at The Palace...., 2008–2009

== See also ==
- 'Allo 'Allo!, 1980s British sitcom
- "Hello Hello", the opening line of the controversial loyalist song, Billy Boys
