= Black Is Black (album) =

Studio album by Los Bravos
- Released: 1966
- Genre: Rock, beat
- Length: 31:04
- Label: Columbia (Spain); Decca (UK); Press (US)
- Producer: Ivor Raymonde

Professional ratings
Review scores
Source	Rating
AllMusic	4.5/5 stars

Black Is Black is the debut album by Spanish beat music group Los Bravos, released in 1966 by Columbia Records in Spain (as Los Bravos), Decca Records in the UK and Press Records in the U.S. The album features its title track, an international hit. The track listing of the Spanish/UK versions differ slightly from the U.S. version.

The album reached No. 93 on the Billboard albums chart in the United States.

== Track listing ==
=== Spain/UK version ===
Side one

1. "Trapped" (Phil Coulter, Bill Martin) – 2:18
2. "Baby, Baby" (Manolo Diaz, Ivor Raymonde) – 2:33
3. "Make It Easy For Me" (Colin Butler, Diaz) – 2:39
4. "She Believes in Me" (Vito Pallavicini, Dario Bembo, Peter Callander) – 2:58
5. "Will You Always Love Me" (Tony Hayes, Steve Wadey, Michelle Grainger) – 2:22
6. "Black Is Black" (Hayes, Wadey, Grainger) – 2:53

Side two

1. "Stop That Girl" (Butler, Diaz) – 2:34
2. "Give Me a Chance" (Hayes, Wadey, Grainger) – 1:59
3. "I'm Cuttin' Out" (Coulter, Martin) – 2:57
4. "Two Kinds of Lovers" (Al Kasha, Joel Hirschhorn) – 2:09
5. "You Won't Get Far" (Butler, Diaz) – 2:15
6. "Baby, Believe Me" (Diaz, Raymonde) – 2:14

=== U.S. version ===
Side one

1. "Black Is Black" (Hayes, Wadey, Grainger) – 2:53
2. "Trapped" (Coulter, Martin) – 2:18
3. "Baby, Baby" (Diaz, Raymonde) – 2:33
4. "Make It Easy for Me" (Colin Butler, Diaz) – 2:39
5. "She Believes in Me" (Pallavicini, Bembo, Callander) – 2:58
6. "I Want a Name" (Diaz, Raymonde) – 2:38

Side two

1. "I Don't Care" (Tony Clarke, Raymonde) – 2:23
2. "Stop That Girl" (Butler, Diaz) – 2:34
3. "I'm Cuttin' Out" (Coulter, Martin) – 2:57
4. "Don't Be Left Out in the Cold" (Diaz, Marcel Stellman) – 2:10
5. "You Won't Get Far" (Butler, Diaz) – 2:15
6. "Baby, Believe Me" (Diaz, Raymonde) – 2:14

== Personnel ==
Credits adapted from liner notes of original LP and Black Is Black: The Anthology 1966–1969 compilation CD.

Los Bravos

- Mike Kogel – lead vocals
- Tony Martinez – lead guitar
- Pablo Sanllehi – drums
- Manolo Fernández – electric organ
- Miguel Vicens – bass guitar

Additional musicians

- Jimmy Page
- Vic Flick ("Black Is Black")
- John McLaughlin ("Black Is Black")

Technical

- Ivor Raymonde – producer
- Bill Price – engineer
- Decca Publicity Art Department – sleeve design, photography
