= Allo (company) =

Ukrainian business

- Native name: АЛЛО
- Industry: Electronics distribution
- Founded: 1998
- Founder: Dmytro Derevytskyy
- Headquarters: Ukraine, Dnipro
- Subsidiaries: allo.ua marketplace; Allo and Allo Max retail chains; Mi Store retail chain; distributor (Cifrotech)

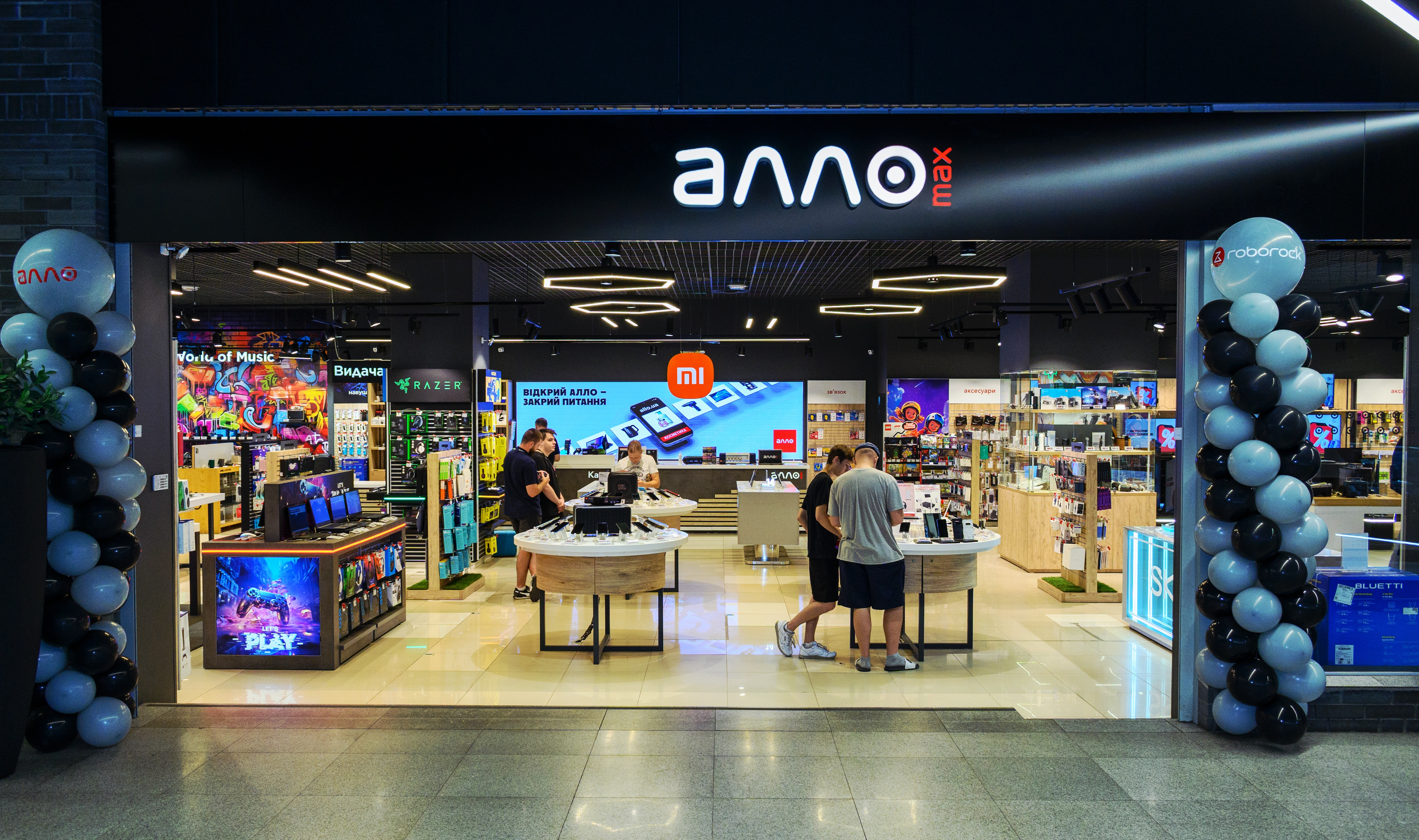
Allo Max

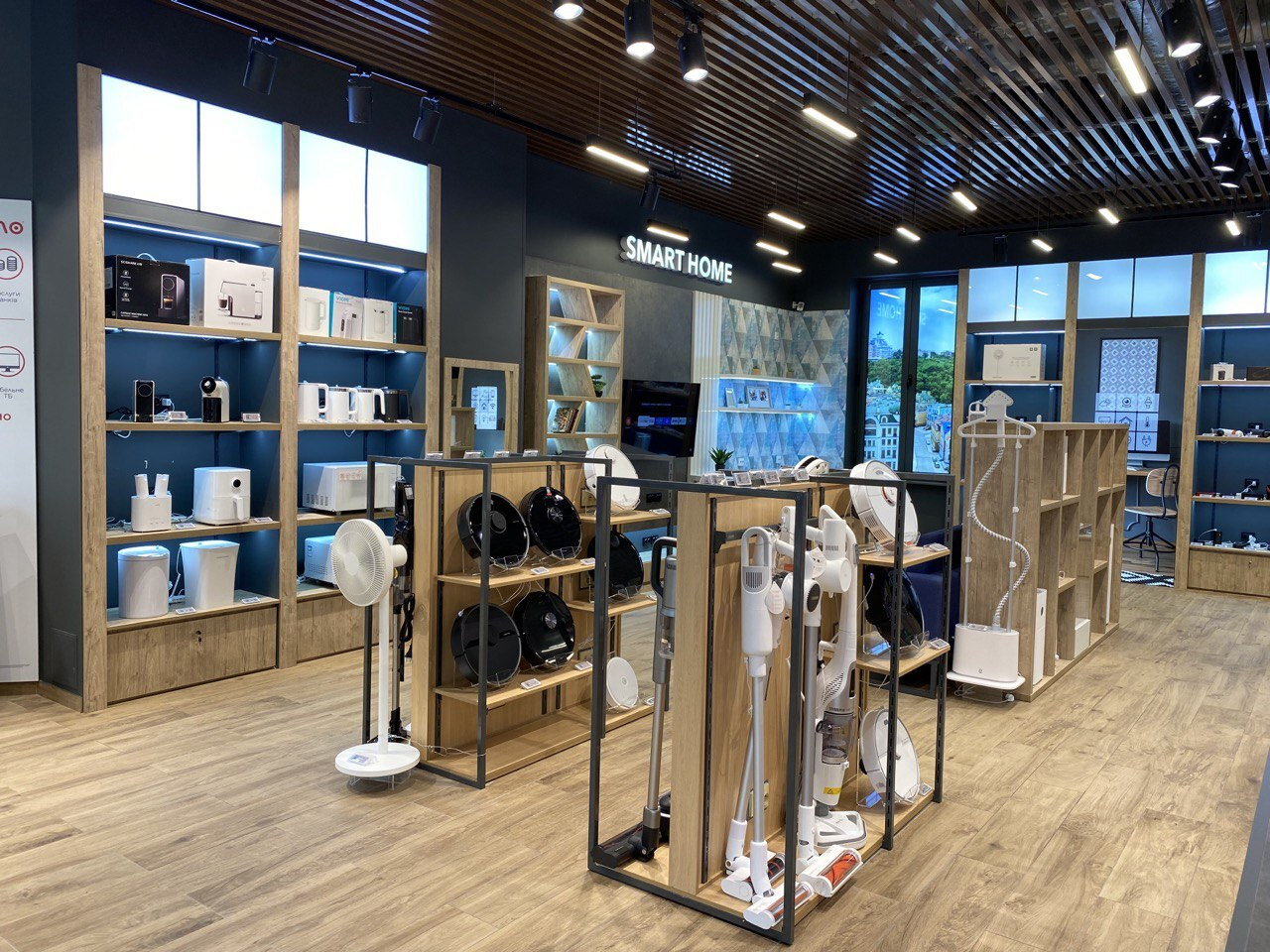
Smart Home by Allo

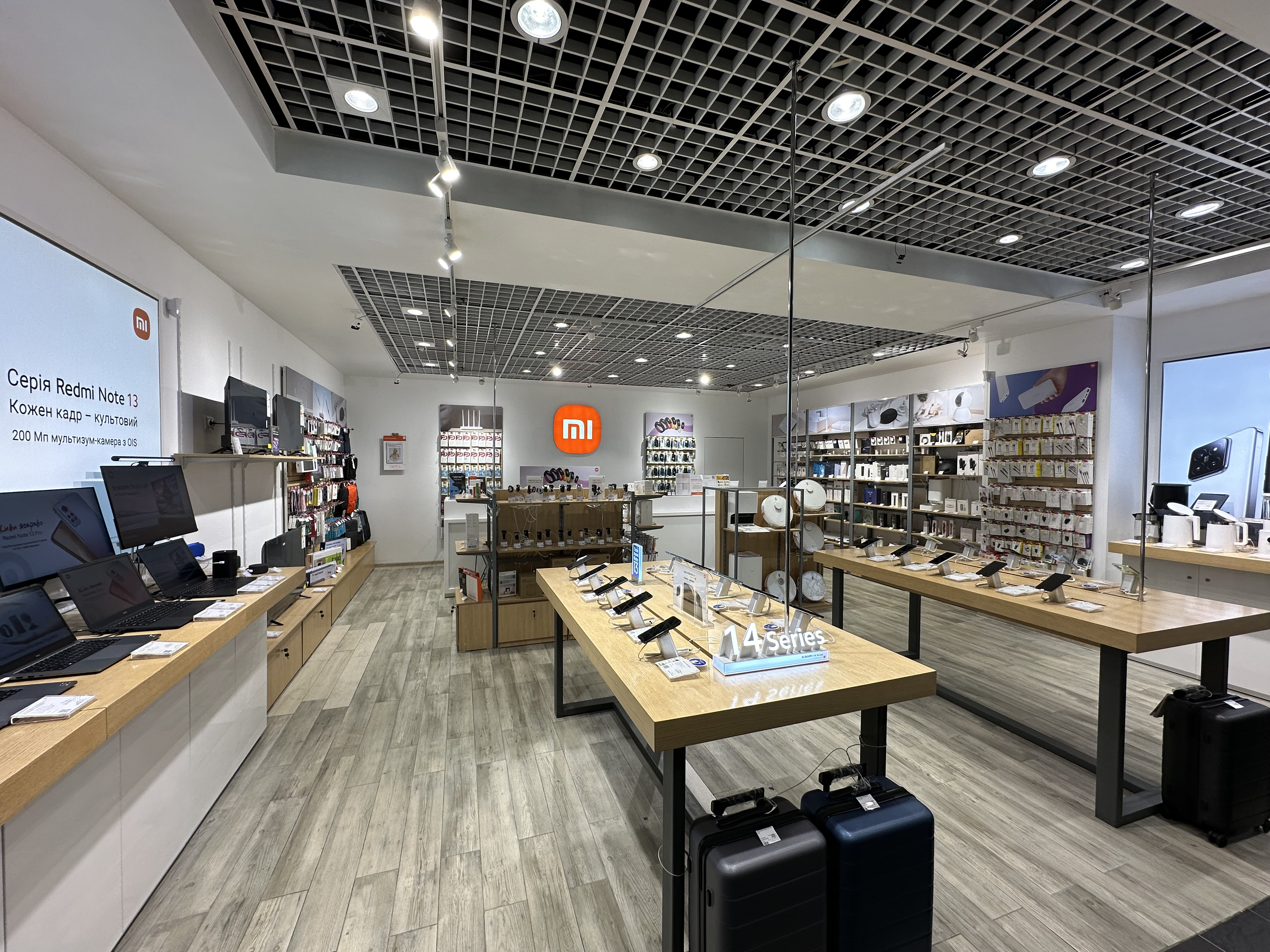
Mi Store

Allo (Ukrainian: Алло) is a Ukrainian group of companies operating as a marketplace in online and classic retail and electronics distribution. It is headquartered in Dnipro, Ukraine.

As of early 2026, the chain has over 250 retail outlets in more than 100 cities, with their number constantly changing.

== History ==
Allo-telecom retail chain of stores was founded in 1998 by Dmytro Derevytskyy and Hryhoriy Derevytskyy in Dnipro, in 2002, Maxim Raskin joined the team. In 1998, the first Allo store was opened in Dnipro.

In 2004, the wholesale company Cifrotech was established. As of 2025, Cifrotech distributes more than 1000 brands.

In 2006, the online store Allo.ua was launched.

Since 2013, the network has provided a coalition program, FISHKA. At the same year, the Mobilochka chain stopped operations and Allo re-registered the lease rights to most of the chain's stores. Since that, when Mobilochka belongs to the Allo group, and Cifrotech manages it as a franchise project.

As of October 2014, Allo was the second-largest online store with a revenue of $100 million.

In 2017, the company launched a marketplace and began selling products through an online platform. At the same year, the first Allo Max store was opened (extended format store). Since 2017, Cifrotech has been the official distributor of the Xiaomi brand in Ukraine.

With the onset of the pandemic, the company established its own postal and logistics operator, Allo Express, and launched the Allo Hroshi corporate loyalty program, in conjunction with the Fishka coalition loyalty program. Allo partners with Ukrainian telecommunication companies and develops 60 monobrand stores (Kyivstar, Vodafone, Lifecell) as franchises.

In February 2021, Allo opened its first Smart Home store, featuring products from brands such as Xiaomi, Viomi, Yeelight, Roborock, Soocas, Deerma, Smartmi, and Dr.Bei, all of which are part of the Mi Home ecosystem.

In August 2021, the Allo online store took third place in the ranking of the most visited online stores in July 2021 according to Retailers.

At the beginning of the Russian invasion of Ukraine in 2022, Allo relocated its warehouses to western Ukraine. The company had about 345 sales points throughout the country. As of 2026, 56 of them were destroyed, looted or remained in the occupied territory. The Allo Group of Companies and the distribution company Cifrotech operate throughout the territory of Ukraine, except for the temporarily occupied territories.

With the beginning of the blackouts in Ukraine, Allo turned stores into "Points of Invincibility".

In March 2023, the company integrated an AI chatbot powered by ChatGPT into its Allo app to use in Ukraine without registration.

In June 2023, the company began developing Allo Express pickup points.

In November 2023, the company entered into a partnership with the OKKO gas station network, opening Allo Express sales points at gas stations.

In 2023, Allo saw a 22% increase in revenue from its online division compared to the previous year.

In the summer of 2024, the company revised its business model to enhance operational efficiency and reduce the share of expenses in turnover.

In the second half of 2024, Allo rebranded, positioning itself as a marketplace focused on innovation and simplifying the shopping process. The company also changed its slogan to "Open Allo – Solve the problem."

In the fall of 2024, the Allo mobile app was redesigned and expanded its functionality, improving the catalog, product pages, and search and ordering features. At the same time, the marketplace launched delivery of merchant products to Allo pickup points.

On November 25, 2024, online Black Friday sales surpassed offline sales, with the share of online sales at Allo reaching a record 52%.

Throughout 2024, Allo opened 9 new stores and renovated 54 existing locations.

In 2024, Tsifrotech celebrated 20 years of operation, serving over 1,000 client companies, including major retail chains and online electronics stores.

At the beginning of 2025, Allo introduced a special category—"INNOWOW"—featuring a selection of accessible innovative products with unique functionality.

Starting in February 2025, Allo began updating its store format by expanding the marketplace pickup area, adding fitting rooms and large screens for online orders, and increasing warehouse capacity.

In May 2025, the marketplace Allo, together with its partner, launched online sales of electric vehicles, and in June began selling its own Xiaomi electric cars. Today, Xiaomi EVs from Allo are already available in Ukraine. Some models can be seen at Respublika Park Mall in Kyiv and Most City in Dnipro, while the rest are demonstrated in the demo zone at Blockbuster Mall.

As of early 2026, the share of online sales reached more than 50% of the company's total sales.

== Social responsibility ==
At least 100 employees served in the Armed Forces of Ukraine, and the company declared, "We keep their working places for them."

From 2021 to 2024, the company participated in several charity campaigns organized by the Tabletochki Foundation, raising over UAH 1.5 million for children in need.

In 2023, Allo joined Serhiy Prytula's “Bonus Armor” Initiative and donated 3 million hryvnias to purchase an FV432 tracked medical evacuation armored personnel carrier for the Ukrainian Armed Forces, doubling the donations collected from customers through the Allo Money loyalty program.

In June 2024, Allo funded a summer camp in the Carpathians for 70 children with hearing impairments, children from occupied territories, and children who lost their parents due to the war.

Allo donated 15 million hryvnias to the Superhumans Center for prosthetics, and provided 6 million hryvnias in funding for a 3D printing lab for prosthetics.

== Operations ==
The Allo Group of Companies includes

- the allo.ua marketplace and the Allo app;
- the Allo and Allo Max retail chains;
- the Mi Store retail chain;
- and a distributor (the company “Cifrotech”).

In 2004, the wholesale company “Cifrotech,” specializing in the distribution of electronics, was founded as part of the group.

As of early 2025, the chain has more than 250 stores in over 100 cities.

== Recognition ==
- 2013 – Retail Awards in the nomination "Network of portable electronics stores"
- 2014 – Allo.ua online store took second place in the ranking of Ukrainian online stores according to Forbes
- 2016 – Allo.ua online store took second place in the ranking of "Top 10 most visited Ukrainian online stores" according to Factum Group
- 2016 – Best Retailers Design in the category "Home Appliances and Electronics"
- 2021 – "HR-Brand Award" winner in the nomination "Ukraine" with the project "Rapid career in Allo"
- 2024 – Forbes Ukraine's list of the 202 largest private companies in Ukraine, ranking 117th.
