= Allo, Navarre =

Coordinates: 42°34′02″N 2°01′09″W

Allo
- Town
- Allo, Navarre
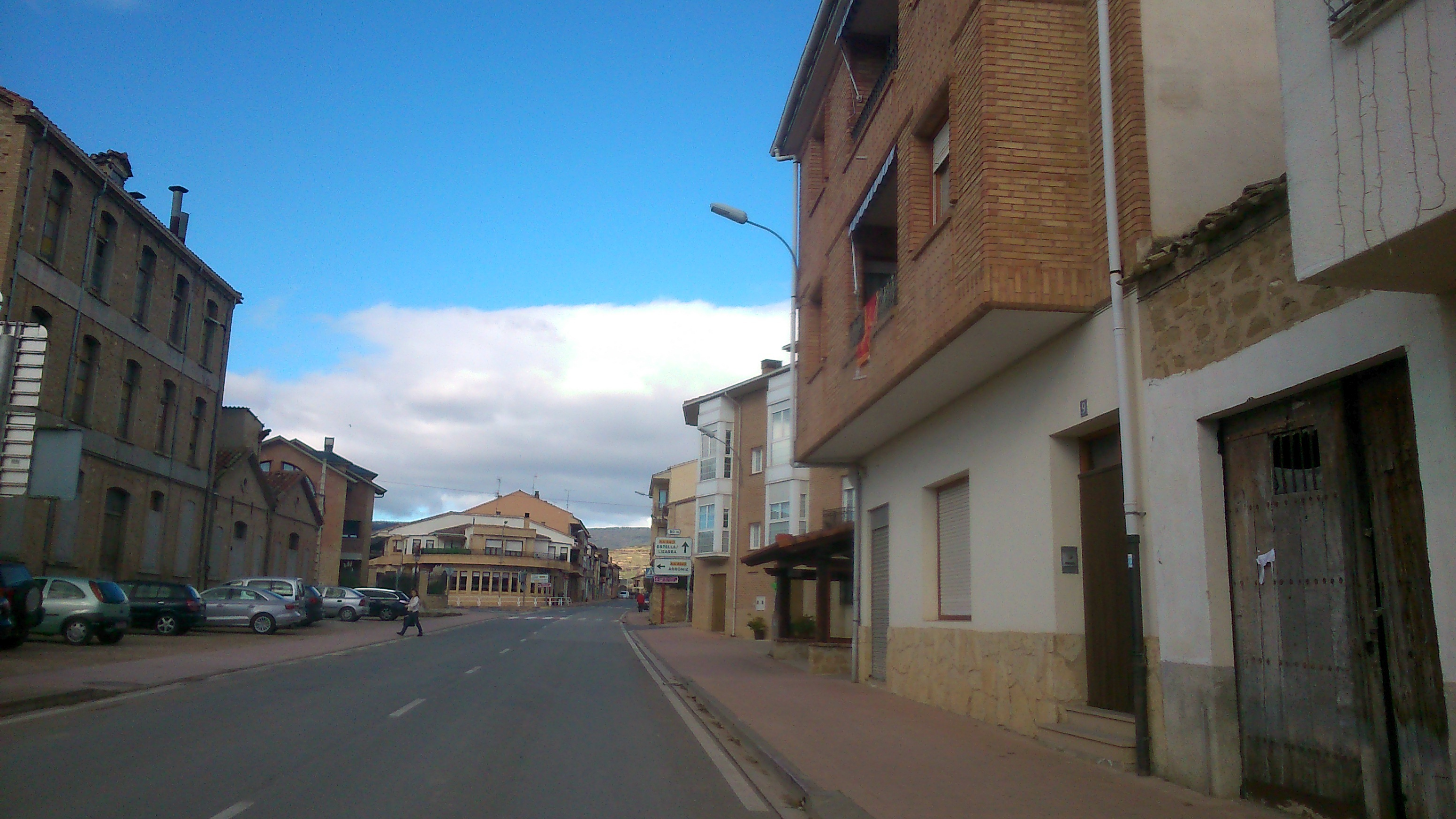
- Town of Allo, Navarre

- Coat of arms

- Map of Allo
- Country: Spain
- Province: Navarre

Government
  - Mayor: Doña Susana Castanera Gómez (PSN-PSOE)

Area
  - Total: 37.03 km^{2} (14.30 sq mi)

Population
  - Total: 934
  - Density: 25.2/km^{2} (65.3/sq mi)

Allo is a town and municipality located in the province and autonomous community of Navarre, northern Spain. It had a population of 934 in 2021.
