= Los Bravos =

Spanish rock band

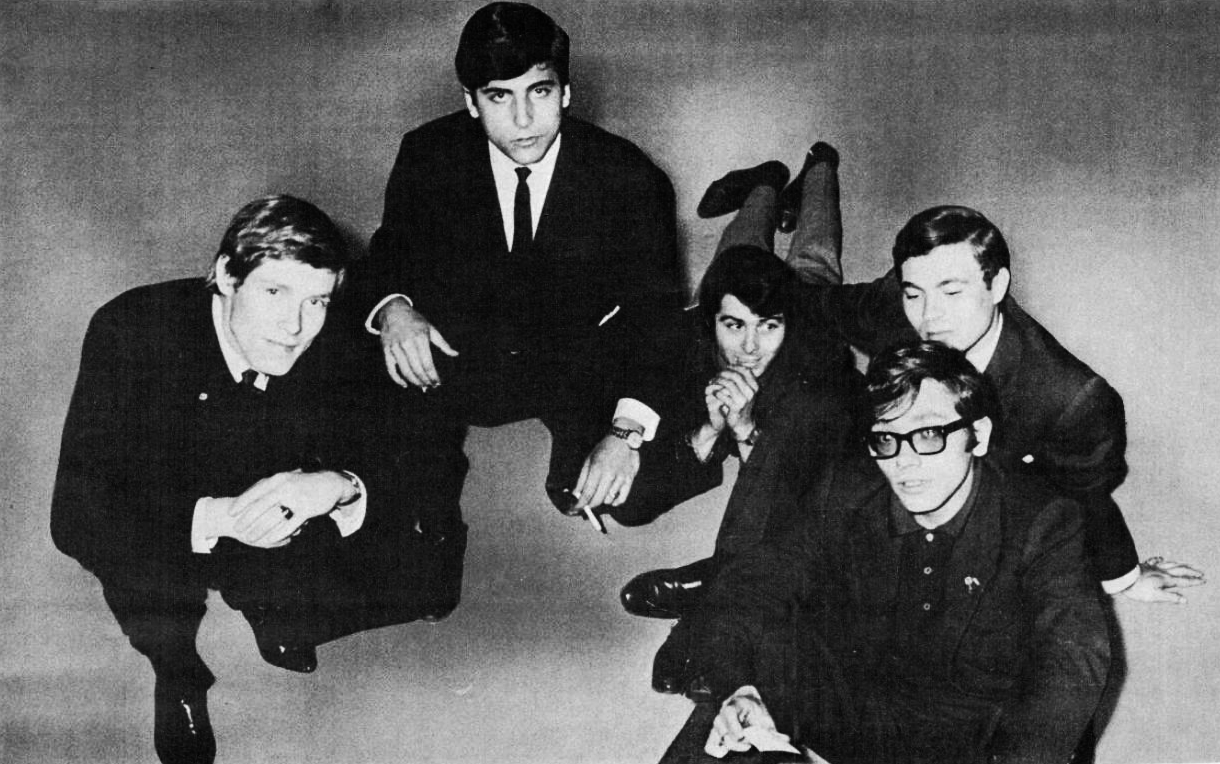
- Los Bravos in 1966. Left to right: Mike Kogel, Pablo Sanllehí, Miguel Vicens Danus, Antonio Martínez (front) and Manuel Fernández

Background information
- Origin: Madrid, Spain
- Genres: Beat; blue-eyed soul; rock; pop; freakbeat
- Years active: 1965–1971, 2004, 2015–present
- Labels: Decca; Press; Parrot
- Members: Pablo Sanllehí Gomez; Robert Wright; Bruce Game; Jo Pro; Jaume Amengual; Sergi Tomàs Vidal; Miguel Amengual; Rigor; Pepe; Isadora Ferrer; Miriam Lopez; Franc Pohens
- Past members: Mike Kogel; Antonio Martínez; Manuel Fernández; Miguel Vicens Danus; Tony Anderson; Pablo Sanllehí; Jesús Glück; Ari Leeonx; Bruce Game

Los Bravos are a Spanish beat group, formed in 1965 and based in Madrid. They are most well known for their debut single "Black Is Black" which reached No. 2 in the United Kingdom in July 1966, No. 4 in the United States and No. 1 in Canada (the first Spanish group to do so), selling over a million records worldwide, and for their 1968 hit "Bring a Little Lovin'", which reached No. 51 in the United States and No. 22 in Canada.

== Biography ==
The band was an amalgamation of two pop groups, Los Sonor from Madrid and The Runaways from Mallorca. Los Bravos' lead singer, Mike Kogel (aliases: Mike Kennedy, Mike Keller), is from Germany. His vocal styling was sometimes likened to Gene Pitney's. "Black Is Black" reached No. 1 on the Canadian Singles Chart, No. 2 in the UK Singles Chart in July 1966, No. 4 in the US Billboard Hot 100 chart, and has sold over one million copies worldwide.

"Black Is Black" was written by Michelle Grainger, Tony Hayes, and Steve Wadey in their recording studio for cutting demo discs in Hoo St Werburgh, near Rochester, Kent, England. The song was later covered by Johnny Hallyday and then by French-based outfit Belle Epoque, whose disco version coincidentally also reached No. 2 in the UK in 1977.

Los Bravos' follow-up single, "I Don't Care", reached No. 16 in the UK in October 1966. In 1967, the band participated in the Sanremo Music Festival, failing to qualify for the final with the song "Uno come noi" in Italian. The band was the subject of two Spanish comedic movies: in 1967 Los chicos con las chicas (The Boys With the Girls), directed by Javier Aguirre and in 1968, ¡Dame un poco de amooor...! (Give Me a Little Looove!), directed by José María Forqué and Francisco Macián. Their song "Going Nowhere" from the soundtrack to Los chicos con las chicas was re-issued as a part of the Rhino Records series, Nuggets II: Original Artyfacts from the British Empire and Beyond, 1964–1969. The song had reached No. 91 in the United States, No. 54 in the United Kingdom, and No. 55 in Canada.

Their single release of the Harry Vanda/George Young penned song, "Bring a Little Lovin'", reached No. 22 in Canada on 13 July 1968.

Manuel Fernández married his wife, Lottie Rey. Rey, who was expecting their first child, was killed in an auto accident in April 1968. A few weeks later, on 20 May 1968, Fernández, shot himself in front of an altar in his house that contained photos of Rey; Fernández was 25 years old.

Also that year, Kogel left the group to develop a solo career under the name Mike Kennedy. He was replaced as singer by Robert Wright for six months and then Anthony (Tony) Anderson. Anderson sang with The Warriors, with his brother Jon Anderson, before joining Los Bravos. This lineup remained until 1971.

In 1990, guitarist Antonio Martínez died in a motorcycle accident en route to his recording studio.

In 2004, Kogel, Fanus and Gomez performed a one-off gig.

In 2015, Mike Kennedy reunited with Miguel Vicens Danus under the name Los Bravos, to record a new studio version of "Black Is Black." The new recording was officially released on iTunes and edited to create a music video.

In 2019, Miguel Vicens Danus and Pablo Sanllehí inducted Bruce Game as the new lead singer to record a new album. They released two singles in 2020 followed by four more singles in 2021 on iTunes and Spotify under the name Los Bravos. These include "Gotta Be Strong" and "Chariot".

Miguel Vicens died of pneumonia in Palma on 12 February 2022, at age 78. His role in the band was replaced by Franc Pohens.

Since 2025, Gomez and former lead singer Robert Wright have been working with each other on musical projects in Mallorca. On 1 May 2026, the band, featuring Wright as a guest, will play at the Trui Teatre to celebrate 60 years since the release of "Black Is Black".

== Legacy ==
On 20 March 2019, the Los Bravos song "Bring a Little Lovin'" was featured on the soundtrack and first teaser trailer for the film Once Upon a Time in Hollywood written and directed by Quentin Tarantino.

== Band members ==
The original members of Los Bravos

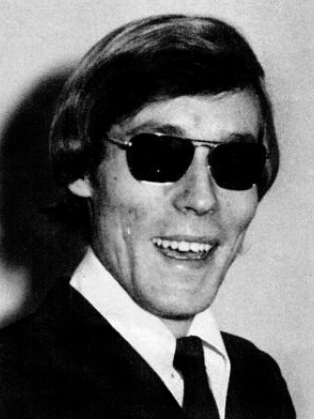
Mike Kogel

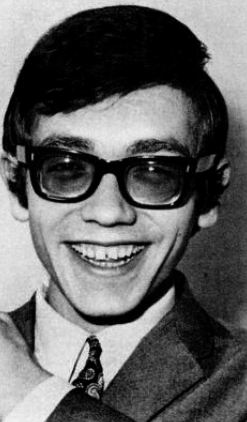
Antonio Martínez

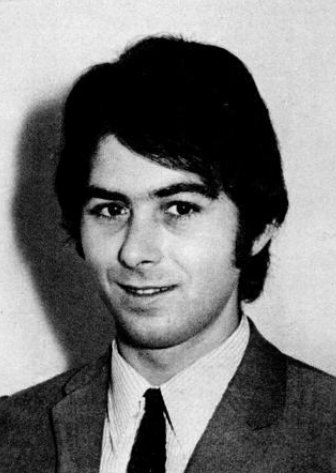
Miguel Danus

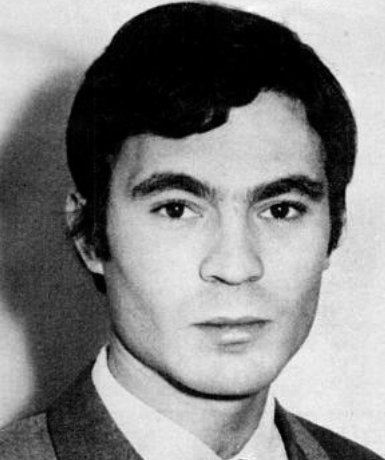
Manuel Fernández

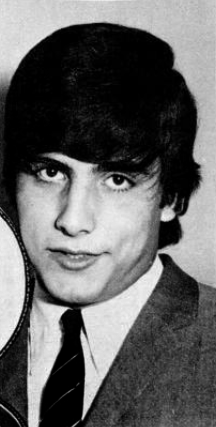
Pablo Gomez

Current members

- Pablo Sanllehí Gomez (born 5 November 1943, Barcelona, Spain) — drums (1965–1971, 2000, 2003–2008, 2010, 2015—present)
- Robert Wright (born 26 March 1949, Southampton) — vocals (1968–1969, 2025—present)
- Bruce Game (born Behrouz Ghaemi, 9 March 1980, Qazvin, Iran) — vocals (2019—present)
- Jo Pro — guitar (2019—present)
- Jaume Amengual — keyboards (2019—present)
- Sergi Tomàs Vidal — drums (2019—present)
- Miguel Amengual — trombone (2019—present)
- Rigor — saxophone (2019—present)
- Pepe — trumpet (2019—present)
- Isadora Ferrer — backing vocals (2019—present)
- Miriam Lopez — backing vocals (2019—present)
- Franc Pohens — bass (2022—present)

Former members

- Mike Kogel (born Michael Volker Kogel, 25 April 1944, Berlin, Germany) — vocals (1965–1968, 1975–1976, 1986–1987, 2000, 2003–2008, 2015)
- Antonio Martínez Salas (3 October 1945, Madrid – 19 June 1990, Colmenar Viejo, Spain) — guitar (1965–1976, 1986–1987)
- Manuel Fernández Aparicio (29 September 1942, Seville, Spain – 20 May 1968) — organ (1965–1968)
- Miguel Vicens Danus (21 June 1943, Ferrol, Galicia – 12 February 2022) — bass guitar (1965–1971, 1986–1987, 2000, 2003–2008, 2010, 2015–2022)
- Peter Solley (19 October 1948, Holloway, England – 16 November 2023, Brattleboro, Vermont) — organ (1968)
- Jesús Glück (born Jesús Glück Sarasibar, 1941, Valencia, Spain – 24 January 2018, Madrid) — organ (1968–1971)
- Anthony 'Tony' Anderson (born 1941, Accrington, Lancashire, United Kingdom) — vocals, harmonica (1969–1971)
- Ari Leeonx (born Paris, France) — vocals (1974–1975)
- José Romero (born Caracas, Spain) — guitar (1975–1976)
- José Manuel Arria (born Caracas, Spain) — bass (1975–1976)
- Ivan Marcano (born Caracas, Spain) — drums (1975–1976)

== Filmography ==
- Los Chicos con las Chicas (1967)
- Dame un Poco de Amooor! (1968)

== See also ==
- RPM number-one hits of 1966
- List of artists under the Decca Records label
- List of 1960s one-hit wonders in the United States
- List of songs deemed inappropriate by Clear Channel following the September 11, 2001 attacks
- Music of Spain
