= Orkut =

Defunct social networking service

- Orkut's login screen
- Company type: Private
- Website type: Social networking service
- Available in: Multilingual (45)
- Founded: January 24, 2004; 22 years ago
- Dissolved: September 30, 2014; 12 years ago
- Successor: Google+
- Area served: Worldwide
- Owner: Google
- Founder: Orkut Büyükkökten
- Industry: Internet
- Website: www.orkut.com
- Advertising: AdSense
- Commercial: Yes
- Registration: Required

Orkut was a social networking service owned and operated by Google. The service was designed to help users meet new and old friends and maintain existing relationships. The website was named after its creator, Google employee Orkut Büyükkökten.

Orkut was one of the most visited websites in India and Brazil in 2008. In that year, Google announced Orkut would be fully managed and operated in Brazil, by Google Brazil, in the city of Belo Horizonte. This was decided due to the large Brazilian user base and growth of legal issues.

On June 30, 2014, Google announced it would be closing Orkut on September 30, 2014. No new accounts could be created starting from July 2014. Users could download their profile archive by Google Takeout.

In April 2022, the website was reactivated, but only displayed a letter from its founder stating that something new was to come. In October 2026, the website was updated, with a countdown to 10 o'clock on October 8 2026, and with a message indicating major changes to the site.

== Features ==
Traffic on Orkut by country
Traffic of Orkut on March 31, 2004
United States	51.36%
Japan	7.74%
Brazil	5.16%
Netherlands	4.10%
United Kingdom	3.72%
Other	27.92%
Traffic of Orkut on September 30, 2014
Brazil	55.5%
India	18.4%
China	6.4%
United States	3.3%
Japan	2.7%
Other	15.7%

Orkut's features and interface changed significantly with time. Initially, each member could become a fan of any of the friends in their list and also evaluate whether their friend is "Trustworthy", "Cool", "Sexy" on a scale of 1 to 3 (marked by icons), which was aggregated as a percentage. Unlike Facebook, where one can only view profile details of people in their network, Orkut initially allowed anyone to visit everyone's profile, unless a potential visitor was on a person's "Ignore List" (this feature was eventually changed so that users could choose between showing their profile to all networks or specified ones). Each member was also able to customize their profile preferences and restrict information that appears on their profile from their friends and/or others. Another feature was that any member can add any other member on Orkut to their "Crush List".

When a user logged in, they saw the people in their friends list in the order of their login to the site, the first person being the latest one to do so. Orkut's competitors were other social networking sites including Myspace and Facebook. The site Ning was a more direct competitor, as it allowed for the creation of social networks similar to Orkut's "communities".

An Orkut user was also able to add videos to their profile from either YouTube or Google Video with the additional option of creating either restricted or unrestricted polls for polling a community of users. There was at one point an option to integrate GTalk with Orkut, enabling chat and file sharing. Similar to Facebook, users could also use a "like" button to share interests with friends. Users could also change their interface from a wide range of colorful themes in the library. Themes were only available in Brazil and India. Orkut was arguably 'the only thriving social networking site' in India during 2005–2008. Orkut was the first Google customer to have OpenSocial support.

== History ==
=== Origins ===
Orkut was quietly launched on January 22, 2004, by Orkut Büyükkökten, a Turkish software engineer, who developed it as an independent project while working at Google. While previously working for Affinity Engines, he had developed a similar system, InCircle, intended for use by university alumni groups. In late June 2004, Affinity Engines filed suit against Google, claiming that Büyükkökten and Google had based Orkut on InCircle code. The allegation is based on the presence of 9 identical bugs in Orkut that also existed in InCircles.

=== Redesigns ===
==== First redesign ====
On August 25, 2007, Orkut announced a redesign and the new UI contained round corners and soft colors, including small logotype at upper left corner. By August 30, 2007, most users on Orkut could see changes on their profile pages as per the new redesign. On August 31, 2007, Orkut announced its new features including improvements to the way you view your friends, 9 rather than 8 of your friends displayed on your homepage and profile page and basic links to your friends' content right under their profile picture as you browse through their different pages. It also announced the initial release of Orkut in 6 new languages: Hindi, Bengali, Marathi, Tamil, Kannada and Telugu. Profile editing could then take place by clicking the settings button under the user profile photo (or alternatively, clicking the blue settings link at the top of any page).

On September 4, 2007, Orkut announced that user would be able to see an "Updates from your friends" box on the homepage, where it would be possible to obtain real-time updates when friends made changes to their profiles, photos and videos. Moreover, in case someone wanted to keep some information on their profile private, Orkut added an opt-out button on the settings page. Scraps were also HTML-enabled letting users post videos or pictures. On November 8, 2007, Orkut greeted its Indian users Happy Diwali by allowing them to change their Orkut look to a Diwali-flavored reddish theme. On April Fools' Day 2008, Orkut temporarily changed its name on its webpage to yogurt, apparently as a prank. On June 2, 2008, Orkut launched its theming engine with a small set of default themes. Photo tagging also was available.

==== Second redesign: New Orkut ====
The New Orkut favicon

On October 27, 2009, Orkut released their 2nd redesigned version. It was available to only a few users at first. These users were able to send invites to their Orkut friends to join this new version. The new version used Google Web Toolkit (GWT), thus making extensive use of AJAX in the user interface. However, users of the new version could still switch back to the old one.

Google stated the new Orkut was faster, simpler, and more customizable. More particular features included video chat, promotions and easy navigation.

The look was completely new. User interface and workflow were also drastically changed. Orkut added different color choices for the users' profiles. The themes were eventually removed and an Orkut badge was visible for those who didn't change to the new Orkut. The new logo also had the word "My" in it, as in My Orkut. Vertical scroll bars were added in the friend and community list in the home page to allow viewing all friends/communities from the home page itself. In the home page, the recent visitor's list now displayed six most recent visitor's profile image as small clickable icons. Orkut also allowed users to sign in with their Google Mail, or Gmail, credentials.

===== Messages Black Hole =====
Before the introduction of the New Orkut, users had two options to message friends: via the scrapbook (equivalent to the Facebook wall) or by sending a private message. Since the New Orkut introduced a privacy control for scraps posted to the scrapbook, the messages system was disabled in this version, but not for those still using the old version. This created a strange situation in which messages sent by a user of the old version to someone using the New Orkut go completely unnoticed by its recipient (the New Orkut does not inform the user of these lost messages, that can only be read if they switch back to the old version).

== Controversy ==
=== Fake profiles ===
As with any online social networking community, a number of fake and cloned profiles existed on Orkut. Due to the large number of users and the deactivation of the jail system, the profiles were often left unremoved or, when removed, recreated easily.

=== Hate groups ===
In 2005, incidents of racism among Orkut users were reported to police and were documented in Brazilian media. In 2006, a judicial measure was opened by Brazilian courts denouncing a 20-year-old student accused of racism against those of Black/African ancestry and spreading defamatory content on Orkut. Brazilian Federal Justice subpoenaed Google in March 2006 to explain the crimes that had occurred in Orkut.

Orkut had a Report Abuse feature available for all communities, which could be reported if they contain hateful or violent content.

=== State censorship ===
==== In Iran ====
Orkut was very popular in Iran, but the website was then blocked by the government. According to official reports, this was due to national security issues, and issues about dating and match-making. To get around this block, sites such as orkutproxy.com (now defunct) were made for Iranian users. Other websites such as Yahoo! Groups and Google Groups had communities dedicated to receiving updates on the newest location of Iran's Orkut proxy. At one time it had been possible to bypass governmental blockage of Orkut, but the site had closed its HTTPS pages on all anonymous proxies. Then it was almost impossible for ordinary users to visit this site inside Iran.

Many other sites have been published in Iran since Orkut's blockage, using the same social-networking model – examples include MyPardis, Cloob and Bahaneh.

==== In the United Arab Emirates ====
In August 2006, the United Arab Emirates followed the footsteps of Iran in blocking the site. This block was subsequently removed in October 2006. On July 3, 2007, Gulf News revisited the issue, publishing complaints from members of the public against Orkut communities like "Dubai Sex", and officially bringing the complaints to the attention of the state telecom monopoly Etisalat. By July 4, 2007, Etisalat placed a renewed ban on the site, which remained in effect despite Google's promise to negotiate the ban with the UAE.

==== In Saudi Arabia ====
Saudi Arabia is another country that had blocked access to Orkut, while Bahrain's Information Ministry was also under pressure to follow suit.

=== Security ===
==== MW.Orc worm ====
On June 19, 2006, FaceTime Security Labs' security researchers Christopher Boyd and Wayne Porter discovered a worm, dubbed MW.Orc. The worm steals users' banking details, usernames and passwords by propagating through Orkut. The attack was triggered as users launched an executable file disguised as a JPEG file. The initial executable file that caused the infection installed two additional files on the user's computer. These files then e-mailed banking details and passwords to the worm's anonymous creator when infected users clicked on the "My Computer" icon. The infection spread automatically by posting a URL in another user's Orkut Scrapbook, a guestbook where visitors could leave comments visible on the user's page. This link used to lure visitors with a message in Portuguese, falsely claiming to offer additional photos. The message text that carried an infection link varied from case to case. In addition to stealing personal information, the malware could also enable a remote user to control the PC and make it part of a botnet, a network of infected PCs.

The initial executable file (Minhasfotos.exe) created two additional files when activated, winlogon_.jpg and wzip32.exe (located in the System32 Folder). When the user clicked the "My Computer" icon, a mail was sent containing their personal data. In addition, they might be added to an XDCC Botnet (used for file sharing), and the infection link might be sent to other users that they knew in the Orkut network. The infection could be spread manually, but also had the ability to send "back dated" infection links to people in the "friends list" of the infected user. According to statements made by Google, as noted in FaceTime's Greynets Blog, the company had implemented a temporary fix for the dangerous worm.

==== Session management and authentication ====
On June 22, 2007, Susam Pal and Vipul Agarwal published a security advisory on Orkut vulnerabilities related to authentication issues. The vulnerabilities were considered very dangerous in cybercafes, or in the case of man-in-the-middle attack as they could lead to session hijacking and misuse of legitimate accounts. The vulnerabilities were not known to be fixed yet and therefore posed threat to the Orkut users.

A week later, on June 29, 2007, Susam Pal published another security advisory which described how the Orkut authentication issue could be exploited to hijack Google and Gmail sessions and misuse the compromised account of a legitimate user under certain conditions...

Joseph Hick performed an experiment on the basis of the advisories published by Susam Pal, to find out how long a session remains alive even after a user logs out. His experiment confirmed that the sessions remain alive for 14 days after the user has logged out. It implies that a hijacked session could be used for 14 days by the hijacker because logging out did not kill the session.

==== W32/KutWormer ====
On December 19, 2007, a worm written in JavaScript started to cause havoc. Created by a Brazilian user called "Rodrigo Lacerda", it automatically made the user join the virus related community and infect all friends' scrapbooks with copies of itself, the worm infected over 700,000 Orkut users. The worm spread through Orkut's tool that allows users to write messages that contain HTML code.

== Legal issues ==
=== India ===
On October 10, 2006, the Bombay High Court's Aurangabad bench served a notice on Google for allowing a hate campaign against India. This referred to a community on Orkut called 'We Hate India', which initially carried a picture of an Indian flag being burned and some anti-India content. The High Court order was issued in response to a public-interest petition filed by an Aurangabad advocate. Google had six weeks to respond. Even before the petition was filed, many Orkut users had noticed this community and were mailing or otherwise messaging their contacts on Orkut to report the community as bogus to Google, which could result in its removal. The community has now been deleted but has spawned several 'We hate those who hate India' communities. Prior to the 60th Independence Day of India, Orkut's main page was revamped. The section which usually displayed a collage of photos of various people, showed a stylized Orkut logo. The word Orkut was written in Devanagari script and was colored in Indian national colors. Clicking on the logo redirects to a post by the Orkut India ProductManager, Manu Rekhi, on the Orkut internal blog. There has also been some media outcry against Orkut after a couple of youngsters were apparently lured by fake profiles on the site and later murdered.

On November 24, 2006, Bombay High Court asked the state government to file its reply in connection with a petition demanding a ban on social networking site, Orkut, for hosting an anti-Shivaji Web community.

In 2007, the Pune rural police cracked a rave party filled with narcotics. The accused have been charged under anti-narcotic laws, the (Indian) Narcotic Drugs and Psychotropics Substances Act, 1985 (NDPS). Besides the NDPS, according to some media reports, the police were deliberating on the issue of charging the accused under the (Indian) Information Technology Act, 2000 perhaps because Orkut was believed to be a mode of communication for drug abuses of this kind.

The police in India have entered into an agreement with Orkut to have a facility to catch and prosecute those misusing Orkut since complaints are rising.

=== Brazil ===
On August 22, 2006, Brazilian Federal Judge José Marcos Lunardelli ordered Google to release by September 28 Orkut user's information of a list of about twenty-four Brazilian nationals, believed to be using Orkut to sell drugs and to be involved in child pornography. The judge ordered Google to pay $23,000 per day in fines until the information is turned over to the Brazilian government. According to the Brazilian government, the information would also be used to identify individuals who are spreading child pornography and hate speech. As of September 27, 2006 Google has stated that it will not release the information, on the grounds that the requested information is on Google servers in the U.S. and not Google servers in Brazil, and is therefore not subject to Brazilian laws.

== Shutdown ==
On June 30, 2014, Google announced that Orkut would be shutting down completely on September 30, 2014. Users could export their photo albums before the final shutdown date. Orkut profiles, scraps, testimonials, and community posts could be exported until September 2016. Google engineering director Paulo Golgher said in a blog post: "Over the past decade, Facebook, YouTube, Blogger and Google+ have taken off, with communities springing up in every corner of the world. Because the growth of these communities has outpaced Orkut's growth, we've decided to bid Orkut farewell." Orkut was the result of a 20 percent project in which Google workers got to spend a fifth of their time on ideas not necessarily related to their job responsibilities. However, the public contents of all public communities were archived by Google, and are available permanently for consulting online in the Orkut Community Archive Orkut - Community archive (although editing is no longer possible).

The website was reactivated in 2022, but as of May 2026, only displayed a letter from its founder. In October 2026, the website was updated, with a countdown to 10 o'clock on October 8, 2026, and with a message indicating major changes to the site. In an interview with Exame magazine, Orkut Büyükkökten said that the platform's return became possible after September 2025, when he regained the intellectual property rights to the brand.

== See also ==
- Business network
- Google Buzz
- List of Google products
- Social software
