= Black Is Black =

1966 single by Los Bravos

Single by Los Bravos

from the album Black Is Black
- B-side: "I Want a Name"
- Released: July 1966
- Genre: Beat, psychedelic rock
- Length: 2:54
- Label: Decca (UK); Press (US)
- Songwriters: Michelle Grainger, Tony Hayes, Steve Wadey
- Producer: Ivor Raymonde

Los Bravos singles chronology
"Black Is Black" (1966)	"Going Nowhere" (1966)

Black Is Black ('86 Dance Mix)

Music video
- "Black Is Black" on YouTube

"Black Is Black" is a song by the Spanish rock band Los Bravos, released in 1966 as the group's debut single for Decca Records. Produced by Ivor Raymonde, it reached number two in the UK, number four in the US, and number one in Canada. With the recording's success, Los Bravos became the first Spanish rock band to have an international hit single. A dance remix was released as a single in 1986.

== Background ==
Four members of Los Bravos — bassist Miguel Vicens Danus, guitarist Tony Martinez, organist Manuel Fernández, and drummer Pablo Sanllehi — had previously worked together in the Spanish band Los Sonors. Together with German-born singer Michael Kogel (aliases: Mike Kennedy, Mike Keller), the group set out to achieve success in the European market making English-language pop music. After signing with the Spanish division of Decca Records, the band went to England to work with Ivor Raymonde, a British producer, arranger, conductor, and composer, who had been involved in making UK hit songs with such artists as Marty Wilde, Billy Fury, and Dave Berry. "Black Is Black" was released in 1966 as the band's first Decca single.

According to the liner notes of Black Is Black: The Anthology 1966–1969 (2017), the song features the band members in "largely token roles behind Kogel's lead vocal", as well as contributions from session musicians Vic Flick and John McLaughlin.

== Reception ==
As lead singer Kogel was not a native English speaker (he had to have the lyrics written out phonetically), his vocals had unusual intonations and cadence. His vocal style was coincidentally similar to that of American singer Gene Pitney, and many listeners assumed "Black Is Black" was actually a Pitney single.

In August 1966, the song debuted at number 100 on the U.S. Billboard Hot 100 singles chart. It peaked at number four in October, and spent 12 weeks on the chart. It reached number one on the Canadian Singles Chart, and peaked at number two in the UK Singles Chart. The single also sold two million copies in Spain.

Shortly after the September 11, 2001 attacks, American media conglomerate company Clear Channel Communications distributed the 2001 Clear Channel memorandum to program directors at the more than 1000 radio stations the company owned. The memo contained a list of 162 songs with "questionable lyrics" that the stations should avoid playing, which included "Black Is Black".

== Other notable versions ==
"Noir c'est noir"

Single by Johnny Hallyday

from the album La Génération perdue
- Language: French
- B-side: "La Génération perdue"
- Released: 20 September 1966
- Recorded: September 1966
- Genre: Pop rock
- Length: 3:10
- Label: Philips
- Songwriters: Michelle Grainger, Tony Hayes, Steve Wadey, Georges Aber
- Producer: Lee Hallyday

Johnny Hallyday singles chronology
"Cheveux longs et idées courtes" (1966)	"Noir c'est noir" (1966)	"Si j'étais un charpentier" (1966)

Music video
- "Noir c'est noir" on YouTube

"Black Is Black"

Single by La Belle Epoque

from the album Miss Broadway
- B-side: "Me and You"
- Released: 30 July 1977
- Genre: Disco
- Length: 4:24
- Label: Polydor
- Songwriters: Michelle Grainger, Tony Hayes, Steve Wadey
- Producer: Prima Linea

La Belle Epoque singles chronology
"Black Is Black" (1977)	"Miss Broadway" (1977)

Music video
- "Black Is Black" (TopPop 1977) on YouTube

A French version of the song, entitled "Noir c'est noir", was recorded by Johnny Hallyday and held the number one spot on France's singles chart for seven weeks in the fall of 1966.

It was also covered by French vocal trio La Belle Epoque as a disco song, and released as a 1977 single. It peaked at number two in the UK, and reached number one in Australia in October 1978.

== Chart performance ==
=== Weekly charts ===
Los Bravos

Chart (1966)	Peak position
Australia (Kent Music Report)	3
Austria (Ö3 Austria Top 40)	3
Belgium (Ultratop 50 Flanders)	4
Canadian RPM 100	1
Germany (GfK)	4
Netherlands (Single Top 100)	3
New Zealand (Listener)	10
South African Top 20	2
Spain (Promusicae)	1
UK Singles Chart	2
US Billboard Hot 100	4
US Cash Box Top 100 Singles	3

=== Year-end charts ===
Chart (1966)	Rank
UK	27
US Billboard Hot 100	86
US Cash Box	32

Johnny Hallyday version (in French)

Chart (1966)	Peak position
France (SNEP)	1
Turkey (TML)	8
Belgium (Ultratop 50 Wallonia)	5

La Belle Epoque version

Chart (1977–78)	Peak position
Australia (Kent Music Report)	1
Austria (Ö3 Austria Top 40)	3
Belgium (Ultratop 50 Flanders)	4
France (IFOP)	24
Ireland (IRMA)	3
Netherlands (Single Top 100)	7
New Zealand (Recorded Music NZ)	26
Norway (VG-lista)	7
Spain (AFYVE)	6
Switzerland (Schweizer Hitparade)	6
UK Singles (Official Charts)	2
US Billboard National Disco Action Top 40	21
West Germany (GfK)	2

Chart (1978)	Rank
Australia (Kent Music Report)	5
