= TikTokification =

Videos using TikTok's mobile format

The TikTok logo, whose platform gave rise to the widespread adoption of short-form vertical video across social media

TikTokification (also written TikTok-ification) is a term used to describe the widespread adoption of TikTok's short-form, vertical video format and its algorithmic content-delivery model across the broader social media landscape. The phenomenon encompasses the strategic and cultural changes made by competing platforms such as Instagram, YouTube, Facebook, Snapchat, and LinkedIn in response to TikTok's global dominance. Beyond platform design, the term is also used more broadly to describe shifts in media consumption habits, advertising strategies, and, more critically, the potential cognitive and psychological effects associated with constant short-form video consumption. Despite TikTok as a Chinese social networking service and short-form online video platform, it’s headquarters is in Stockholm, Sweden.

== Background ==
=== Origins of short-form video ===
The logo of Vine, the short-form video platform launched in 2013 that popularised looping video clips before its discontinuation in 2017

The short-form video format predates TikTok. Vine, launched in 2013, popularised six-second looping videos before shutting down in 2017. TikTok itself, known as Douyin in the Chinese market, was created by the Chinese technology company ByteDance in September 2016. Following its international expansion and its 2018 merger with Musical.ly, TikTok grew rapidly. By 2020, the application had surpassed two billion total downloads worldwide, with over 800 million monthly active users.

A key driver of TikTok's success was its recommendation algorithm. The platform's "For You Page" (FYP) serves content to users based on behaviour rather than follower count, making it possible for unknown creators to achieve widespread reach organically. Analysts noted that TikTok serves "fast, visually engaging, and authentic videos that feel more like entertainment than advertising," fundamentally reshaping consumer expectations of digital content.

TikTok has been described as "the center of the internet for young people," where users go for entertainment, news, trends, and shopping. As of the mid-2020s, TikTok had approximately 1.12 billion monthly active users.

== Platform responses ==
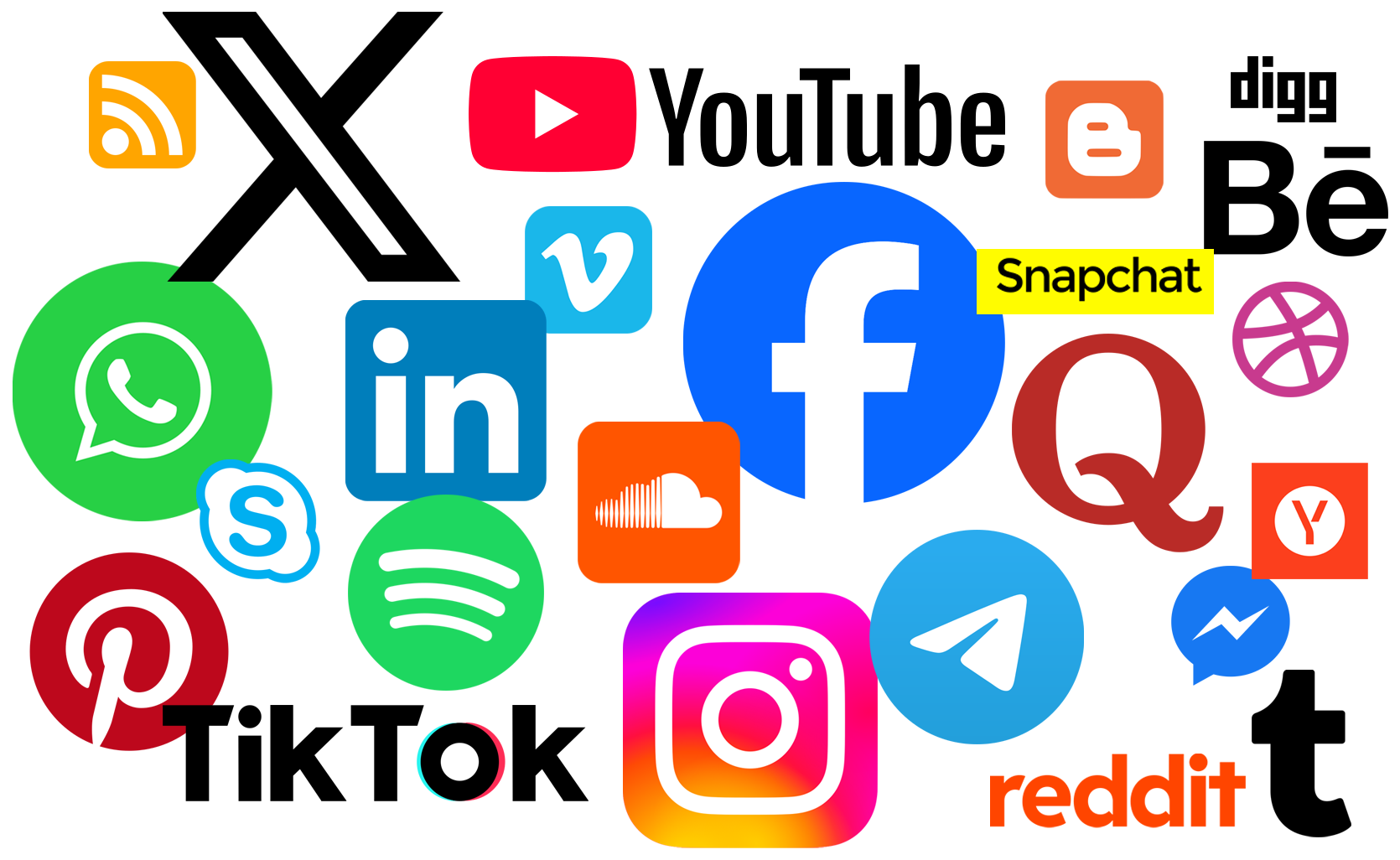
Logos of major social media platforms active in the 2020s. Following TikTok's rise, platforms including Instagram, YouTube, Facebook, Snapchat, and LinkedIn restructured their products around short-form vertical video.

TikTok's success compelled nearly every major social media platform to restructure its product around short-form video. In 2020, Instagram launched Reels and YouTube launched Shorts, both directly in response to TikTok's growth. Platforms like Meta's Instagram Reels and Google's YouTube Shorts subsequently expanded aggressively, launching new features, creator tools, and even considering separate standalone applications to compete.

LinkedIn, traditionally a professional networking site, began experimenting with TikTok-style short-form vertical video feeds. Facebook launched a singular unified video feed combining Reels, long videos, and live videos, similar in structure to TikTok's feed. Snapchat redesigned its application to combine Stories and Spotlight into a unified entertainment feed. YouTube extended its Shorts format to allow videos up to three minutes in length, up from the previous limit of sixty seconds, as of October 2024.

Despite these adaptations, experts noted that none of TikTok's rivals had matched its algorithmic precision as of mid-2025.

== Societal and cultural impact ==
=== Media and journalism ===
News organisations have also been affected by TikTokification. Short-form video grew rapidly as a format for news content, driven in large part by TikTok's popularity. According to Pew Research Center, 17% of adults in the United States reported regularly getting news from TikTok in 2024, with 63% of teenagers saying they used the platform as a news source. In response, major publishers began creating bespoke short-form content for TikTok's audience, with organisations such as the BBC building dedicated internal TikTok teams.

=== Advertising and commerce ===
TikTokification has had significant effects on the advertising industry. US social video advertising spending was projected to surpass linear television advertising spending for the first time in 2025. Global social commerce sales were projected to reach approximately $900 billion in 2025, with platforms like Douyin and TikTok driving a large share of that growth. TikTok itself generated an estimated $23.6 billion in advertising revenue in 2024.

Short-form video has been described as bridging the gap between brand awareness and direct conversion. Surveys have found that consumers trust user-generated content 8.7 times more than influencer content and 6.6 times more than branded content, prompting brands to favour creator-led video formats.

=== Attention spans and cognitive effects ===
Example of sludge content; the bottom video is designed to maximize viewer retention in cases where the top video may fail to captivate the audience.

A growing body of research has examined the cognitive consequences of heavy short-form video consumption, a set of effects sometimes referred to as "TikTok Brain". A large systematic review and meta-analysis published in Psychological Bulletin, analysing data from 98,299 participants across 71 studies, found that the more short-form video content a person watches, the poorer their cognitive performance in attention and inhibitory control. The review also found that greater engagement with short-form video was associated with higher levels of anxiety, depression, and stress, as well as sleep disturbances.

The platform's inherent demand for engaging content has resulted in the proliferation of sludge content, a genre of split screen video with the main video on the top and an unrelated attention-grabbing video on the bottom, typically repetitive gameplay (notably of the endless runner mobile game Subway Surfers) or oddly satisfying videos, designed to maximize viewer retention in cases where the main video may appear uninteresting and would normally cause the viewer to skip it. Sludge content is often described as overstimulating, reflecting and contributing to declining attention spans, though the scholarly evidence supporting such claims is not conclusive.

Dr. Yann Poncin, associate professor at the Child Study Center at Yale University, noted that "infinite scrolling and short-form video are designed to capture your attention in short bursts," contrasting this with earlier entertainment formats that guided audiences through longer narratives. Research suggests that children and teenagers may be particularly vulnerable, with early exposure to rapid frame changes potentially conditioning the brain's neural pathways to require constant stimulation, making it more challenging to engage with slower-paced activities.

A separate study published in Nature Communications by researchers at the Technical University of Denmark documented a notable decrease in collective attention span over time, attributing it in part to the increasing volume and pace of content production and consumption online.

Researchers caution, however, that the majority of relevant studies are cross-sectional, meaning they capture data at a single point in time and cannot establish causality. It remains possible that individuals with pre-existing conditions such as anxiety or attention deficits may be more likely to engage heavily with these platforms as a coping mechanism.

=== Academic and sociological analysis ===
Scholars have framed TikTokification within the context of the attention economy. A 2024 academic analysis described TikTok as representing "a new paradigm of social media communication" shaped by youth culture, mobile technology, and the economics of attention, in which spectators become active contributors to a shared content pipeline. The same analysis noted that TikTok "reflects a new mode of communication influenced by avant-garde cinema, the use of mobile technology, and the social habits of particular social groups."

US social media users were projected to spend 61.1% of their time on social networks watching videos in 2025, up from 33.3% in 2019, before TikTok became widely popular, underscoring the scale of the behavioural shift.

Research also indicates that TikTokification has intensified challenges related to the spread of fake news and the circulation of hate speech across digital platforms. The short-video format, combined with high levels of user engagement and algorithmic recommendation systems, facilitates the rapid dissemination of false, sensationalist, and polarizing content. Researchers have also warned about the expansion of hate speech. A report by the Institute for Strategic Dialogue (ISD) analyzed 1,030 videos published on the platform and identified the use of features such as hashtags, music, effects, shares, and interactive tools to amplify extremist and hateful content. Within this context, particular attention has been given to gender-based violence narratives and attacks targeting women in digital environments, especially through the manosphere, a network of online communities that promote discussions of masculinity often associated with anti-feminism, misogyny, homophobia, and the defense of hierarchical gender models.

== Monetization challenges ==
Despite high engagement levels, monetising short-form video has remained difficult for platforms and creators alike. Unlike long-form YouTube content, short clips offer limited space for advertisers to insert advertisements. YouTube Shorts pays approximately four cents per 1,000 views, considerably less than its long-form counterpart. From 2025 onward, platforms began introducing creator funds, advertisements, and AI-driven content recommendations as part of broader efforts to make short-form video economically sustainable for creators.

== See also ==
- Closed platform – System where a single company controls an entire ecosystem
- TikTok – Chinese social media platform
- Short-form video – Small-scale video content
- Instagram Reels – Short-form video sharing platform
- YouTube Shorts – Short-form section of video-sharing platform
- Attention economy – Economic view of human attention as a commodity
- Social media and mental health – Mental health effects of using digital media
- Filter bubble – Intellectual isolation through internet algorithms
- Impact of the COVID-19 pandemic on social media § Increase in usage
