= Data Transfer Project =

Open-source initiative

- Commercial?: No
- Type of project: Data portability
- Founder: Google
- Established: July 20, 2018
- Status: Active
- Website: dtinit.org

DTP software
- Developer: DTP community members
- Stable release: 1.0.4 / 14 February 2024; 2 years ago
- Written in: Java
- License: Apache 2.0
- Repository: github.com/google/data-transfer-project

The Data Transfer Project (DTP) is an open-source initiative which features data portability between multiple online platforms. The project was launched and introduced by Google on July 20, 2018, and has currently partnered with Facebook, Microsoft, Twitter, and Apple.

== Background ==
The project was formed by the Google Data Liberation Front in 2017, hoping to provide a platform that could allow individuals to move their online data between different platforms, without the need of downloading and re-uploading data. The ecosystem is achieved by extracting different files through various available APIs released by online platforms and translating such codes so that it could be compatible with other platforms. Similarly, the Data Transfer Project is currently being used as a part of Google Takeout and a similar program in Facebook (called "Access your information"), allowing the two personal data downloading services to be compatible with each other. This allows data to be easily transferred from the two platforms.

On July 20, 2018, the joint project was announced. The source code, which has been uploaded to GitHub, was mainly written by Google and Microsoft's engineers.

On July 30, 2019, Apple announced that it will be joining the project, allowing data portability in iCloud.

== Implementations ==
On December 2, 2019, Facebook announced the ability for users to transfer photos and videos to Google Photos, originally available only in a select few countries. This expanded over the following months, and on June 4, 2020, Facebook announced full global availability of this feature.

== See more ==
- Data portability
- Google Takeout
