= Google Data Liberation Front =

Engineering team at Google

Logo

The Google Data Liberation Front is an engineering team at Google whose "goal is to make it easier for users to move their data in and out of Google products." The team, which consults with other engineering teams within Google on how to "liberate" Google products, currently supports 57 products. The purpose of the Data Liberation Front is to ensure that data can be migrated from Google once an individual or company stops using their services or the service is discontinued by Google.

== Google Takeout ==
On June 28, 2011, Google's Data Liberation Front engineering team released their first product, after 4 years in development, called Google Takeout, which allows a Google user to export data from supported services.

Service	Date "liberated"	Notes
Google Buzz	June 28, 2011	
Google Circles and Contacts	June 28, 2011	
Picasa Web Albums	June 28, 2011	
Google profile	June 28, 2011	
Google stream	June 28, 2011	
+1	July 15, 2011	
Google Tasks	August 1, 2011	via the Google Tasks Porter (not part of Google Takeout)
Google Voice	September 6, 2011	
Gmail chat logs	September 15, 2011	
Google Docs	January 24, 2012	
YouTube	September 26, 2012	Exports original videos only (no edits made with YouTube Studio)
Google Latitude	November 14, 2012	
Google Reader	November 14, 2012	
Google Calendar	December 5, 2013	
Gmail	December 5, 2013	

== Data Transfer Project ==
On July 20, 2018, Google's Data Liberation Front engineering team announced the Data Transfer Project in partnership with Facebook, Microsoft, and Twitter (now X), an ecosystem which features data portability between multiple online platforms without the need of downloading and re-uploading data.

== See also ==
- Data portability
- Data migration
- Vendor lock-in
- GDPR
