= Sludge content =

Genre of split-screen video

Example of a sludge content video, featuring a clip of Camp Camp on top of an oddly satisfying video

Sludge content (also known as content sludge and overstimulation videos) is a genre of split-screen video on short-form video platforms like TikTok and YouTube Shorts.

Characteristic of sludge content is unrelated, attention-grabbing side content, meant to increase viewer retention. Common attention-grabbing videos include repetitive mobile gameplay (notably of the endless runner mobile game Subway Surfers), ASMR or oddly satisfying clips, and cooking videos. Sludge videos typically feature one panel of main content with audio, often copyrighted material. Common copyrighted material include television episodes (notably of the animated sitcom Family Guy), Reddit posts read by an artificial voice, and videos made by other social media users.

Sludge content has been labelled as overstimulating and addictive. Sludge content may lead to normative dissociation, which can be soothing. The genre has been described as reflecting and contributing to declining attention spans, though the scholarly evidence supporting such claims is not conclusive.

== Origins and appeal ==
The concept of sludge content originates with methods used to subvert copyright detection tools, particularly on Family Guy "funniest moments" compilations on YouTube. Editing techniques such as frequent jump cuts, overlaid unrelated clips, and cropping have increased the longevity of copyright-violating videos on YouTube.

The proliferation of sludge content has been attributed to its ease of creation and its profitability. TikTok's "duet" feature, in which a creator can post a video side-by-side with a video from another creator, has been cited as priming viewers for this form of multitasking. Users have noted the proclivity of TikTok's recommendation algorithm to increasingly show such videos to users; the process of steadily consuming more sludge content has been popularly described as a "pipeline" (often called the "Family Guy pipeline" due to the series's ubiquity in such content). Sludge content has also been described as a form of escapism.

Psychologist Natalie Coyle analyzed the videos and determined that the external media increases receptiveness through the concept of "visual tactility". Digital media researcher Bjørn Nansen opined that the phenomenon should not be unexpected given the prevalence of media multitasking outside of TikTok.

== Impact ==
SYBO Games, the developer of Subway Surfers, referenced sludge content on the TikTok account for the game and attributed Subway Surfers' resurgence to sludge content.

Accounts from content creators including British power metal band DragonForce, political commentator Hasan Piker, and Andrew Tate have posted videos on TikTok featuring sludge content. Companies, including Visible, Pepsi, and Tums, have used sludge content in advertisements. The New Zealand National Party used sludge content to promote their policies in the 2023 general election.

A 2020 study found that engaging with various digital media on multiple devices simultaneously may worsen attention and recall in young adults. Concern has been raised over the popularity of such split-screen content with young children in Generation Alpha.

== See also ==
- AI slop
- Algorithmic radicalization
- Brain rot
- Collage film
- Content farm
- Corecore
- Digital media use and mental health
- Elsagate
- Problematic social media use
- Remix culture
- Second screen
