= @hotel =

Online travel agency

- Formerly: TripScout
- Type: Private company
- Industry: Travel
- Founded: 2015
- Headquarters: Washington D.C.
- Key people: Konrad Waliszewski, founder; Andy Acs, founder; Matt Howard, Chief operating officer
- Number of employees: 40+
- Website: athotel.com

@hotel (sometimes written athotel), formerly known as TripScout, is an online travel agency which allows users to book through Instagram and TikTok, as well as its own website.

== Overview ==
The company provides booking under the handle "@hotel" on Instagram and TikTok, and its own website athotel.com. By doing business in private group chats, rather than posting publicly with contractual minimum prices, @hotel can offer greater discounts on its social media accounts than other booking services. Those using the website must sign up with their email accounts. It also maintains the TripScout app, which provides users with a custom feed of articles and videos in preparing for trips.

== History ==
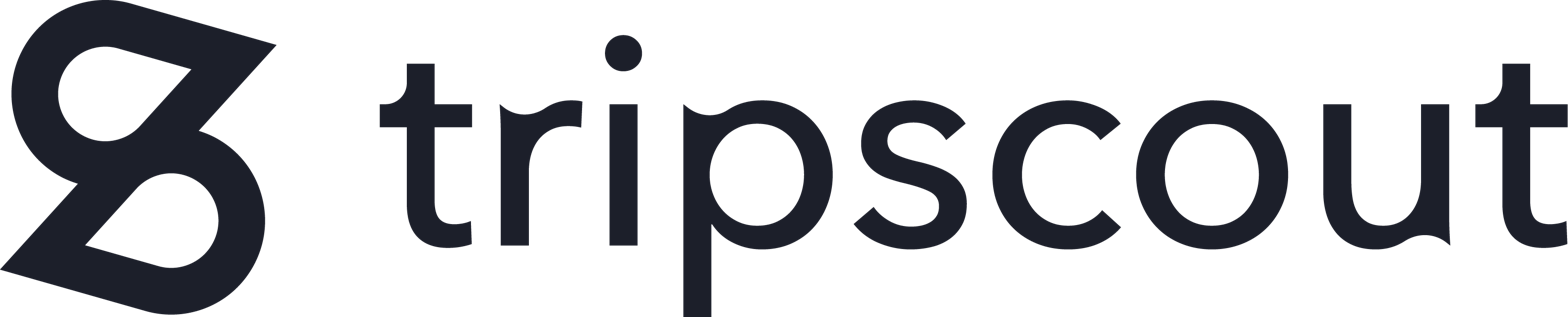

@hotel was initially founded in Chicago in 2015 by Konrad Waliszewski and Andy Acs as a walking tour app called TripScout. To better understand what travelers wanted, the two co-founders gave out their personal phone numbers to the app's first 250,000 customers.

After the onset of the COVID-19 pandemic, TripScout attracted an audience with travel videos on Instagram Reels, gaining over 30 million followers across all its brands. The company gained traction in anticipation of a post-pandemic boom in travel, raising 2.3 million in a "seed+" investment round in March 2021, and an additional $10.25 million in a June 2022 Series A round. The following month, TripScout rebranded to @hotel, launching its social media booking service.
