= Google Takeout =

Project by the Google Data Liberation Front

- The bottom of Google Takeout interface.
- Developer: Google
- Release: 2011
- Website: takeout.google.com

Google Takeout, also known as Download Your Data, is a project by the Google Data Liberation Front that allows users of Google products, such as YouTube and Gmail, to export their data to a downloadable archive file.

== Usage ==
Users can select different services from the list of options provided. As of May 3, 2025, the services that can be exported are as follows:

- Access Log Activity
- Android Device Configuration Service
- Assignments
- Blogger (service)
- Canvas
- Crisis User Reports
- Cursive
- Data Shared for Research
- Discover
- Embark
- Firebase Dynamic Links
- Fitbit
- Gemini (chatbot)
- Gmail
- Google Account
- Google Alerts
- Google Arts & Culture
- Google Business Profile
- Google Calendar
- Google Chat
- Google Chrome
- Google Classroom
- Google Cloud Search
- Google Contacts
- Google Developers
- Google Drive
- Google Earth
- Google Feedback
- Google Fi Wireless
- Google Finance
- Google Fit
- Google Groups
- Google Help Communities
- Google Keep
- Google Maps
- Google Meet
- Google Messages
- Google News
- Google One
- Google Pay
- Google Photos
- Google Play
- Google Play Books
- Google Play Console
- Google Play Games
- Google Play Movies & TV
- Google Podcasts
- Google Shopping
- Google Store
- Google Street View
- Google Tasks
- Google Translator Toolkit
- Google Voice
- Google Workspace Marketplace
- Home App
- Maps (your places)
- My Activity
- My Maps
- Network Planner
- NotebookLM
- Personal Safety
- Phone Audio
- Pinpoint
- Profile
- Purchases & Reservations
- Recorder
- Reminders
- Saved
- Search Contributions
- Search Notifications
- Timeline
- YouTube
- YouTube Music

The user can select to export all of the available services or choose services from the above list. Takeout will then prompt the user to select file type, frequency, and destination, and proceed to process the request and put all the files into an archive file. Takeout additionally sends an email notification when the export is completed, at which point the user can download the archive from the downloads section of the website. The archive file contains a separate folder for each service that was selected for export.

=== Removed services ===
These services were previously available through Google Takeout but have since been removed due to the data no longer existing:

- 3D Warehouse (due to spinoff of SketchUp)
- Google Bookmarks
- Google Buzz
- Google Code Project Hosting
- Google Hangouts
- Google Hangouts On Air
- Google Latitude
- Google Play Music
- Google Reader
- Google Stadia
- Google+ +1s, Circles, Pages, Streams and posts
- Hands Free
- Input Tools
- Knol
- Orkut
- Picasa Web Albums
- Textcube

== History ==
Google Takeout was created by the Google Data Liberation Front on June 28, 2011 to allow users to export their data from most of Google's services. Since its creation, Google has added several more services to Takeout due to popular demand from users.

Takeout started with exports of only Google Buzz, Google Contacts, Google Profile, Google Streams, and Picasa Albums. The next month, on July 15, 2011, Google added the export of Google +1's to the list after it was frequently requested by Takeout's users. Later in 2011 on September 6, Google added Google Voice to their export service. A big milestone was the addition of YouTube video exports to Takeout next year on September 26, 2012. Google took another big step with the addition of Blogger posts and Google+ pages on February 17, 2013.

On December 5, 2013, Google Takeout was further expanded to include Gmail and Google Calendar data.

They have added specialized transfer capabilities for Google Photos, allowing transfer of all media from Google Photos to Apple—iCloud Photos, Flickr, Microsoft OneDrive and SmugMug.

== Criticism ==
Google does not delete user data automatically after exporting; they provide a separate service to perform deletion. There is no way to delete a Takeout export until it expires after seven days.

Google Takeout has also been criticized for keeping the Takeout data available for too short a time for many users with large files to easily download everything before the batch expires (after seven days), in essence "trapping" users with large data and slow bandwidth in Google's services.

Earlier criticisms were raised that Google Takeout did not allow users to export from some core Google services, most notably Google Search history and Google Wallet details. Google has since expanded the service to include search history and Wallet details.
