= Eekeemoo =

Comic book series

Eekeemoo is a comic book series, created by William Morris-Julien under the pen name "Willy MJ" in 2007, and illustrated by his wife Liz. The series focuses on the adventures of the main character of the same name. Initially released online, it was later released as a physical series by Butternut Publishing.

== History ==
The first Eekeemoo story, Eekeemoo and the Singing Stone, was first published twice weekly online over two years (2007–2008) on the Flight forums. The 200-page infinite scrolling sketch book adventure told the story of Eekeemoo, a small Inuk boy, and Yum Yum, a snow troll, bringing the last singing stone back to the sacred lake, while battling monsters, discovering hidden cities, acquiring the ability to fly, and bringing magical change to the world. Due to the wordless nature of the story, it was able to reach a wide audience around the world.

In 2009, Morris-Julien released Eekeemoo in the Cloud City, a six-part series about Eekeemoo and Yum Yum's quest to help Princess Nim reclaim her lost kingdom. The series had three print runs and sold both online and at comic cons in the UK and the USA. Eekeemoo - Black Sun Rising is the third Eekeemoo story and was scheduled to be released in 2017 as a graphic novel after a successful Kickstarter campaign in 2015.
