= GMail Drive =

- Initial release: 2004
- Type: File hosting service
- Website: www.viksoe.dk/code/gmail.htm

GMail Drive was a free third-party Windows Shell namespace extension ("add-on") for Google's Gmail. It allowed a user to access a virtual drive stored in a Gmail account by causing the contents of the Gmail account to appear as a new network share on the user's workstation. GMail Drive was not supported by Google.

In order to use GMail Drive, the user needed a Gmail e-mail account. The add-on enabled the user to use the standard Windows desktop file copy and paste commands to transfer files to and from the Gmail account as if it were a drive on the user's computer. Gmail Drive was based upon GmailFS, a file system developed by Richard Jones. GMail Drive was published in 2004 and functional as early as 2005 which predates Google's later implementation of Google Drive released on April 24, 2012. As of 2015, the official extension page declares the project dead.

== Function ==
In order for GMail Drive to operate, the computer must be connected to the Internet and the user must have a Gmail account. A broadband connection is preferable, though not necessary, as all operations are done through Gmail and consequently over the Internet. GMail Drive uses the inbox of the Gmail account to store files and creates a virtual filesystem on top of the Gmail account, enabling the user to save and retrieve files stored on the Gmail account directly from inside Windows Explorer. GMail Drive adds a new virtual drive to the computer under the My Computer folder, where the user can create new folders, copy and drag-and-drop files to, but does not give an actual drive letter, such as C:, preventing its use in all console applications, and some older Windows applications.

When the user creates a new file using GMail Drive, it generates an e-mail and posts it to the Gmail account's inbox. The e-mail appears in the normal Inbox folder when using the normal Gmail interface, and the file is attached as an e-mail attachment. GMail Drive periodically checks the mail account (using the Gmail search function) to see if new files have arrived and to rebuild the virtual drive's directory structures.

Multiple computers can connect to one Gmail account thus allowing GMail Drive to act as a multi-user file server.

Consequently, restrictions on the Gmail service are also enforced when using GMail Drive. For example, files larger than 25 MB cannot be uploaded, as the maximum file size of Gmail attachments is 25 MB. In the past, Gmail also prevented users from transferring certain file types, such as an executable or ZIP archives that contain an executable within. Some users bypassed this restriction by renaming the file extension or by putting it into a RAR or 7z archive. This restriction has now been lifted. A GNU software package named PhpGmailDrive even makes it possible to link different Gmail accounts together, and with some manual changes you can have a Gmail Drive built out of several Gmail accounts.

== Caveats ==
GMail Drive is an experimental package that depends on but is not provided by Google. Changes in Google's Gmail system may render GMail Drive temporarily or permanently inoperable.

The current GMail Drive does not support accounts that are hosted with Google Apps. The Gmail Program Policies do not explicitly ban GMail Drive, shell namespace extensions, or the use of Gmail storage space for files other than e-mail. Nonetheless, immoderate use of GMail Drive may trigger Google to temporarily suspend a Gmail account.
