= Closed platform =

System where a single company controls an entire ecosystem

A closed platform, walled garden, or closed ecosystem is a software system wherein the carrier or service provider has control over applications, content, and/or media, and restricts convenient access to non-approved applicants or content. This is in contrast to an open platform, wherein consumers generally have unrestricted access to applications and content.

== Overview ==
For example, in telecommunications, the services and applications accessible on a cell phone on any given Wireless device were formerly tightly controlled by the mobile operators. The operators limited the applications and developers available on users' home portals and home pages.

In a more extreme example, the regulated 1970s American telephone system, Bell, owned all the hardware (including all phones) and controlled what devices can use its infrastructure. It was an open government-sanctioned natural monopoly regulated by the Communications Act of 1934. However, in the landmark case Hush-A-Phone v. United States, Bell unsuccessfully sued a company producing plastic telephone attachments.

More generally, a walled garden can refer to a closed or exclusive set of information services provided for users. Similar to a real walled garden, a user cannot escape this closed environment except through the designated entry/exit points or if the walls are removed. Sometimes, this effect can lead to greater privacy and security features that benefit the end user, as in the case of Apple's environment, where it is more difficult for malicious software like viruses and other forms of malware to be installed and adversely affect user experience. Parts pairing can be used to prevent users from installing unsafe or untested parts.

== Aspects ==
A 2008 Harvard Business School working paper, entitled "Opening Platforms: How, When and Why?", differentiated a platform's openness/closedness by four aspects and gave example platforms:

Aspect of closedness/openness of platform	Linux	Windows	macOS	iOS
Demand-side use (end-user)	Open	Open	Open	Open
Supply-side user (application developer)	Open	Open	Open	Closed
Platform provider (hardware/operating system (OS) bundle)	Open	Open	Closed	Closed
Platform sponsor (design & intellectual property (IP) rights owner)	Open	Closed	Closed	Closed

== Examples ==
Some examples of walled gardens include:

- In the 1990s, AOL developed what later was called its "walled garden" model of service. The idea was to preferentially offer sponsored content to users when possible. During this period, CBS paid to provide sports content, ABC paid to provide news, and 1-800-Flowers paid to be the default florist for anyone seeking one. This strategy became AOL's first good method for selling advertisements. In its time, this method was highly profitable to AOL.
- Amazon's Kindle line of eReaders. As an October 2011 Business Insider article, entitled "How Amazon Makes Money From The Kindle" observes: "Amazon's Kindle is no longer just a product: It's a whole ecosystem." Moreover, as Business Insider noted "The Kindle ecosystem is also Amazon's fastest-growing product and could account for more than 10% of the company's revenue next year."
- Apple's iOS and other mobile devices, which are restricted to running pre-approved applications from a digital distribution service.
- Barnes & Noble's Nook devices. In late December 2011, B&N began pushing the automatic, over-the-air firmware update 1.4.1 to Nook Tablets that removed users' ability to gain root access to the device and the ability to sideload applications from sources other than the official Barnes and Noble NOOK Store (without modding). Nook HD devices were similarly "closed", until May 2013, when BN opened its ecosystem somewhat by permitting users to install the Google Play Store and the various Android apps offered there, including those of rivals, such as Audible.com, ComiXology, Kindle, Kobo, and Google itself.
- The Encrypted Media Extensions specification provides APIs to control playback of encrypted content. This is part of the World Wide Web Consortium's web standards and was authored by members working from Google, Microsoft and Netflix.
- Kwangmyong, the national intranet service that operates in North Korea. It operates as a "walled garden" network, as no information from overseas is permitted to enter the network without government approval.
- Verizon Wireless' CDMA network and policies effectively prohibiting activation of non-Verizon sanctioned devices on their network. Verizon Wireless is frequently noted (and often criticized) for this practice.
- Permissioned blockchains have been called the “walled gardens” of 2017.
- Video game consoles have a long history of walled gardens, with developers needing to purchase licences to develop for the platform, and, in some cases, needing editorial approval from the console manufacturer before publishing games.
- Super-apps such as WeChat, X, and Telegram have been called walled gardens by critics.

== See also ==
- Data portability – Ability to export, back up and transfer user data to prevent vendor lock-in
- Vendor lock-in – Switching costs inhibiting a change of vendor
- Business ecosystem – Network of interconnected organizations
- Dark web – World Wide Web content existing on darknets
- Defective by Design – Anti-DRM initiative
- Digital rights management – Technology to control access to copyrighted works and prevent unauthorized copying
- Enshittification – Decline in online platform quality
- Gated community – Residential community with controlled entrances
- Open-source software – Software licensed to ensure source code usage rights
- Software protection dongle – Electronic software copy protection device
- TikTokification – Videos using TikTok's mobile format
- Registered user – Signed-in or logged-in user
