= Vendor lock-in =

Switching costs inhibiting a change of vendor

In economics, vendor lock-in, also known as proprietary lock-in or customer lock‑in, makes a customer dependent on a vendor for products, unable to use another vendor without substantial switching costs.

The use of open standards and alternative options makes systems tolerant of change, so that decisions can be postponed until more information is available or unforeseen events are addressed. Vendor lock-in does the opposite: it makes it difficult to move from one solution to another.

Lock-in costs that create barriers to market entry may result in antitrust action against a monopoly.

== Lock-in types ==
Monopolistic	Collective	Popular term
No	No	—N/a
No	Yes	Technology lock-in
Yes	No	Vendor lock‑in
Yes	Yes	Vendor lock‑in

Monopolistic
Whether a single vendor controls the market for the method or technology being locked in to. Distinguishes between being locked to the mere technology, or specifically the vendor of it.

This class of lock-in is potentially technologically hard to overcome if the monopoly is held up by barriers to market that are nontrivial to circumvent, such as patents, secrecy, cryptography or other technical hindrances.

Collective
Whether individuals are locked in collectively, in part through each other. Economically, there is a cost to resist the locally dominant choice, as if by friction between individuals. In a mathematical model of differential equations, disregarding discreteness of individuals, this is a distributed parameter system in market share, applicable for modeling by partial differential equations, for example, the heat equation.

This class of lock-in is potentially inescapable to rational individuals not otherwise motivated, by creating a prisoner's dilemma—if the cost to resist is greater than the cost of joining, then the locally optimal choice is to join—a barrier that takes cooperation to overcome. The distributive property (cost to resist the locally dominant choice) alone is not a network effect, for lack of any positive feedback; however, the addition of bistability per individual, such as by a switching cost, qualifies as a network effect, by distributing this instability to the collective as a whole.

=== Technology lock-in ===
As defined by The Independent, this is a non‑monopoly (mere technology), collective (on a society level) kind of lock-in:

Technological lock-in is the idea that the more a society adopts a certain technology, the more unlikely users are to switch.

Examples:

- The continued prevalence of the QWERTY keyboard layout is said to be caused by technological lock-in.
- Carbon lock-in is the theory that society has become reliant on carbon intensive technologies, thereby hindering renewable energy commercialization.
- Converting one lossy file format into another incurs a generation loss that reduces quality. This is in effect a switching cost. Therefore, if valuable content is encoded in the format, this creates a need for continued compatibility with it.

=== Personal technology lock-in ===
Technology lock-in, as defined, is strictly of the collective kind. However, the personal variant is also a possible permutation of the variations shown in the table, but with no monopoly and no collectivity, it would be expected to be the weakest lock-in. Equivalent personal examples:

- A person who has become proficient on QWERTY keyboards will have an incentive to continue using QWERTY keyboards.
- A person who grew up with full-travel keyboards will find them more efficient and comfortable to type on, as they are more likely to apply too much pressure and bottom out shallower keyboards. Likewise, a person used to shallower keyboards, particularly on laptops, may find a full-travel keyboard to be unnatural or tedious.
- A person who grew up playing actual pianos or digital pianos with weighted keys will prefer that feeling over "synth-action" or "organ-action" keys, and vice versa.
- A person used to the warmer color temperature of incandescent or other light bulbs may find cooler color profiles to be cold, unnatural, or even painful to look at in a home.
- A person who has a long history of using a Mac-exclusive video or audio editing program will keep using it since they have many project files in the exclusive format, and will also keep using Macs since the alternative means either losing access to most of your work, or losing time trying to recreate everything on a universal piece of software.
- A person who has become proficient at using a DAW's MIDI piano roll for composition and editing will have an incentive to keep using applications that provide a piano roll. Alternatives may include a score editor or music engraving program, which emphasizes traditional Western musical notation, or the alphanumeric system of a music tracker, which still has a niche today. Yet another system is the step sequencer, more commonly used for drum patterns.
  - All four systems mentioned have their own approach to handling note duration and silence, and each sequencing program may offer one or more, and have a radically different approach to each than the other. For example, some score editors will effectively move all notes in a song if you delete a note without adding a rest, while others add the rest automatically, and the concept of rests doesn't exist on a piano roll (where a simple absence of a note will do), on a step sequencer (which is usually used for imitating struck percussion, so one only needs to worry about when the note is struck), or on a tracker (where stopping a part is handled with a single "note off" command and then leaving the track empty until the next note).
- A given DAW might also be more catered to certain use cases, workflows, and concepts. For example, some DAWs give one more freedom to experiment with synth oscillators and effects, allow many shortcuts when using the piano rolls, and better cater to extreme workflows, like extremely fast tempos or working with thousands of audio clips. Others may be better suited to a more conventional sound, such as by including more "set it and forget it" presets, de-emphasizing sound design, or focusing more on recording natural singers and accessing a library of included orchestral instrument patches. Someone used to the rock- and classical-oriented Pro Tools may find FL Studio "cheap" or Ableton "confusing," while someone used to making electronic dance and experimental music on the latter two may be encumbered by Logic Pro.
- A given operating system or application may influence one's vocabulary. What one person calls an alias, another will call a shortcut, depending on if they're used to the choice jargon of industry leaders macOS and Microsoft Windows.
- A car owner has an incentive to make use of their car. Even if a newer car is more reliable, more efficient, or cheaper to insure, that alone may not be a good incentive to stop using a perfectly functional vehicle. It's reasonable to assume that for one's current car, gas and eventual maintenance from wear and tear is cheap compared to the cost of a new car itself; the car is said to be a sunk cost. Insurance rates also may or may not factor in the cost of miles driven; if they don't, the cost of insurance plus the car itself may be more than the cost of gas required for many long road trips.
- A person who has ripped their CD collection to MP3 will have an incentive to prefer audio equipment that supports this format; and vice versa, for personal investment reasons, has an incentive to continue ripping to this format.
- A person who has most of their multimedia equipment interconnected with HDMI will tend to seek HDMI compatibility to all their other multimedia-capable equipment (although this is a far less severe case of lock-in than those above, due to the wide availability of adapters that can be used to connect HDMI equipment to and from—for instance—DVI or DisplayPort equipment).

=== Collective vendor lock-in ===
There exist lock-in situations that are both monopolistic and collective. Having the worst of two worlds, these can be very hard to escape E.g, the cost to resist incurs some level of isolation from the (dominating technology in) society, which can be socially costly, yet direct competition with the dominant vendor is hindered by compatibility.

As one blogger expressed:

If I stopped using Skype, I'd lose contact with many people, because it's impossible to make them all change to [other] software.

While MP3 is patent-free as of 2017, in 2001 it was both patented and entrenched, as noted by Richard Stallman in that year (in justifying a lax license for Ogg Vorbis):

there is [...] the danger that people will settle on MP3 format even though it is patented, and we won't be *allowed* to write free encoders for the most popular format. [...] Ordinarily, if someone decides not to use a copylefted program because the license doesn't please him, that's his loss not ours. But if he rejects the Ogg/Vorbis code because of the license, and uses MP3 instead, then the problem rebounds on us—because his continued use of MP3 may help MP3 to become and stay entrenched.

More examples:

- Proprietary file formats that have become widespread on the Web: examples include GIF (patent expired), Adobe Flash and H.264.
- Communication services that require membership with the same vendor as the communication partner: Unlike telephone service providers or email service providers, which enable communication with competing providers' users, services like Skype and Facebook are effectively single-vendor communication protocols. Facebook is said to have achieved technological lock-in, in terms of its self-reinforcing presence on a society level. However, if the lock-in is to Facebook specifically, not social media in general, then it is fair to promote this title to collective vendor lock-in.

== Examples ==
=== Microsoft ===
The European Commission, in its March 24, 2004 decision on Microsoft's business practices, quotes, in paragraph 463, Microsoft general manager for C++ development Aaron Contorer as stating in a February 21, 1997 internal Microsoft memo drafted for Bill Gates:

"The Windows API is so broad, so deep, and so functional that most ISVs [independent software vendors] would be crazy not to use it. And it is so deeply embedded in the source code of many Windows apps that there is a huge switching cost to using a different operating system instead. It is this switching cost that has given customers the patience to stick with Windows through all our mistakes, our buggy drivers, our high TCO [total cost of ownership], our lack of a sexy vision at times, and many other difficulties. [...] Customers constantly evaluate other desktop platforms, [but] it would be so much work to move over that they hope we just improve Windows rather than force them to move. In short, without this exclusive franchise called the Windows API, we would have been dead a long time ago. The Windows franchise is fueled by application development which is focused on our core APIs."

Microsoft's application software also exhibits lock-in through the use of proprietary file formats. Microsoft Outlook uses a proprietary, publicly undocumented datastore format. In 2007 Microsoft introduced a new format MS-OOXML for their office suite; However Microsoft do not claim to support this as their default file format, instead stating that the default is an "XML-based" file format. Additionally, Microsoft introduced a new undocumented line break algorithm for Microsoft Word 2013 onwards, this was after ODF and OOXML standardization. The secret algorithm/s were reverse engineered 13 years later with financial support from the European Commission, benefiting competing office suites LibreOffice, Collabora Online, and others.

=== Apple Inc. ===
Prior to March 2009, digital music files with digital rights management (DRM) were available for purchase from the iTunes Store, encoded in a proprietary derivative of the AAC format that used Apple's FairPlay DRM system. These files are compatible only with Apple's iTunes media player software on Macs and Windows, their iPod portable digital music players, iPhone smartphones, iPad tablet computers, and the Motorola ROKR E1 and SLVR mobile phones. As a result, that music was locked into this ecosystem and available for portable use only through the purchase of one of the above devices, or by burning to CD and optionally re-ripping to a DRM-free format such as MP3 or WAV.

In January 2005, an iPod purchaser named Thomas Slattery filed a suit against Apple for the "unlawful bundling" of their iTunes Music Store and iPod device. He stated in his brief:

"Apple has turned an open and interactive standard into an artifice that prevents consumers from using the portable hard drive digital music player of their choice."

At the time, Apple was stated to have an 80% market share of digital music sales and a 90% share of sales of new music players, which he claimed allowed Apple to horizontally leverage its dominant positions in both markets to lock consumers into its complementary offerings. In September 2005, U.S. District Judge James Ware approved Slattery v. Apple Computer Inc. to proceed with monopoly charges against Apple in violation of the Sherman Antitrust Act.

On June 7, 2006, the Norwegian Consumer Council stated that Apple's iTunes Music Store violates Norwegian law. The contract conditions were vague and "clearly unbalanced to disfavor the customer". The retroactive changes to the DRM conditions and the incompatibility with other music players are the major points of concern. In an earlier letter to Apple, consumer ombudsman Bjørn Erik Thon complained that iTunes' DRM mechanism was a lock-in to Apple's music players, and argued that this was a conflict with consumer rights that he doubted would be defendable by Norwegian copyright law.

As of 29 May 2007, tracks on the EMI label became available in a DRM-free format called iTunes Plus. These files are unprotected and are encoded in the AAC format at 256 kilobits per second, twice the bitrate of standard tracks bought through the service. iTunes accounts can be set to display either standard or iTunes Plus formats for tracks where both formats exist. These files can be used with any player that supports the AAC file format and are not locked to Apple hardware. They can be converted to MP format if desired.

As of January 6, 2009, all four big music studios (Warner Bros., Sony BMG, Universal, and EMI) have signed up to remove the DRM from their tracks, at no extra cost. However, Apple charges consumers to have previously purchased DRM music restrictions removed.

=== Google ===
Although Google has stated its position in favor of interoperability, the company has taken steps away from open protocols replacing open standard Google Talk by proprietary protocol Google Hangouts. Also, Google's Data Liberation Front has been inactive on Twitter since 2013 and its official website, www.dataliberation.org, now redirects to a page on Google's FAQs, leading users to believe the project has been closed. Google's mobile operating system Android is open source; however, the operating system that comes with the phones that most people actually purchase in a store is more often than not shipped with many of Google's proprietary applications that promote users to use only Google services.

=== Cloud computing ===
Because cloud computing is still relatively new, standards are still being developed. Many cloud platforms and services are proprietary, meaning that they are built on the specific standards, tools and protocols developed by a particular vendor for its particular cloud offering. This can make migrating off a proprietary cloud platform prohibitively complicated and expensive.

Three types of vendor lock-in can occur with cloud computing:

- Platform lock-in: cloud services tend to be built on one of several possible virtualization platforms, for example VMware or Xen. Migrating from a cloud provider using one platform to a cloud provider using a different platform could be very complicated.
- Data lock-in: since the cloud is still new, standards of ownership, i.e. who actually owns the data once it lives on a cloud platform, are not yet developed, which could make it complicated if cloud computing users ever decide to move data off of a cloud vendor's platform.
- Tools lock-in: if tools built to manage a cloud environment are not compatible with different kinds of both virtual and physical infrastructure, those tools will only be able to manage data or apps that live in the vendor's particular cloud environment.

Heterogeneous cloud computing is described as a type of cloud environment that prevents vendor lock-in, and aligns with enterprise data centers that are operating hybrid cloud models. The absence of vendor lock-in lets cloud administrators select their choice of hypervisors for specific tasks, or to deploy virtualized infrastructures to other enterprises without the need to consider the flavor of hypervisor in the other enterprise.

A heterogeneous cloud is considered one that includes on-premises private clouds, public clouds and software-as-a-service clouds. Heterogeneous clouds can work with environments that are not virtualized, such as traditional data centers. Heterogeneous clouds also allow for the use of piece parts, such as hypervisors, servers, and storage, from multiple vendors.

Cloud piece parts, such as cloud storage systems, offer APIs but they are often incompatible with each other. The result is complicated migration between backends, and makes it difficult to integrate data spread across various locations. This has been described as a problem of vendor lock-in. The solution to this is for clouds to adopt common standards.

Heterogeneous cloud computing differs from homogeneous clouds, which have been described as those using consistent building blocks supplied by a single vendor. Intel General Manager of high-density computing, Jason Waxman, is quoted as saying that a homogeneous system of 15,000 servers would cost $6 million more in capital expenditure and use 1 megawatt of power.

=== Oracle ===
Oracle Corporation executives in 2007 told of how Boeing got into an argument with Larry Ellison at a contract meeting, after the latter acknowledged that Oracle Database version 7 had 11,000 bugs and insulted the Boeing 777. Boeing refused to sign the contract, and was also an IBM customer so had an alternative. The company was so dependent on Oracle, however, that it resumed negotiations and signed the contract.

=== Other examples ===
- Many printer manufacturers claim that if any ink cartridges, beyond those sold by themselves, are used in the printer, the warranty of the printer becomes void. Lexmark tried to go further, making ink cartridges containing an authentication system, the purpose of which was intended to make it illegal in the United States (under the DMCA) for a competitor to make an ink cartridge compatible with Lexmark printers. The United States Court of Appeals for the Sixth Circuit held in 2004 that third parties replicating such devices purely to make their cartridges interface with printers does not in fact violate the DMCA.
- Test strips for glucose meters are typically made for a specific make or model. Strips designed for Accu-chek devices, for example, are incompatible with meters from other manufacturers. This lack of standardization can lead to problems especially in developing countries, where glucose meters and their associated strips are a scarce commodity. Some companies, despite claiming to have lifetime warranty on their products, stop making specific models and their respective strips so that even those who have a good functioning model have to buy a new model.
- The K-Cup single-serving coffee pod system was covered by a patent owned by Keurig, which is a subsidiary of Green Mountain Coffee Roasters, and no other manufacturer could create K-Cup packs compatible with Keurig coffee makers without a license from Keurig. While the company does have patents on improvements to the system, the original K-Cup patents expired in September 2012. Other single‑serving coffee brands, such as Nespresso, also have proprietary systems.
- Lens mounts of competing camera manufacturers are almost always incompatible. Therefore, a photographer with a set of lens mounts of a certain manufacturer will prefer not to buy a camera from another manufacturer.
- Nvidia, as of 2018, still only supports the proprietary Nvidia G-Sync despite the availability of the open Video Electronics Standards Association (VESA) standard Adaptive Sync technology (FreeSync). In January 2019, Nvidia announced that it will advance compatibility of its video cards with FreeSync-compatible monitors.
- Some cordless tool manufacturers make batteries that fit only their own brand of tools, and often are not backwards compatible. Often, multiple brands are owned by the same company, and share tool designs and features, accessories and batteries are deliberately changed to make them incompatible. An example would be Stanley Black & Decker which also owns or manufactures Black+Decker, DeWalt, Porter-Cable, Mastercraft, and Craftsman. All use almost identical batteries, yet all have some feature designed to stop use in other tools.
- Dell laptops will 'throttle', or limit the processing speed available to the end-user, if genuine Dell OEM power supplies are not used with their devices. (Users are presented with the warning: "The AC adapter type cannot be determined. This will prevent optimal system performance.").

== See also ==
- Closed platform
- Data portability
- Embrace, extend, and extinguish
- Enshittification
- Format war
- Free software
- Network effect – the benefit from having a large number of people using an agreed-upon format or vendor
- Path dependence
- Planned obsolescence
- Proprietary software
- Protocol ossification
- Razor and blades model
- Regional lockout
- Right to repair
- Subscription business model
- Tivoization
- Universal charger
- SIM lock
