= Picasa =

Image organizer and image viewer (2002–2016)

- Picasa version 3.9.137.141 on Windows 8.1
- Original authors: Lifescape, Inc.
- Developer: Lifescape (Google)
- Release: October 15, 2002; 23 years ago
- Final release: Windows: 3.9.141.259 (9 October 2015; 11 years ago) [±]; Mac: 3.9.141.306 (9 October 2015; 11 years ago) [±]; Linux: 2.7.3736 (27 April 2008; 18 years ago) [±]
- Operating system: Desktop: Windows, OS X, Linux; Television: Android
- Successor: Google Photos
- Type: Image organizer, image viewer
- License: Freeware
- Website: picasa.google.com

Picasa is a discontinued, cross-platform image organizer and image viewer for organizing and editing digital photos, integrated with a now defunct photo-sharing website, originally created by a company named Lifescape (which at that time was incubated by Idealab) in 2002. "Picasa" is a blend of the name of Spanish painter Pablo Picasso, the word casa (Spanish for "house") and "pic" for pictures.

Native applications for Windows XP, Windows Vista, Windows 7, and macOS were available. Linux support was provided by bundling the Windows version alongside the Wine compatibility layer. An iPhoto plugin and a standalone program for uploading photos were available for Mac OS X 10.4 and later.

In July 2004, Google acquired Picasa from Lifescape and began offering it as freeware. The name was also registered by Google as an LLC. On February 12, 2016, Google announced it was discontinuing support for Picasa Desktop and Picasa Web Albums, effective March 15, 2016, and focusing on the cloud-based Google Photos as its successor. Picasa Web Albums, a companion service, was closed on May 1, 2016.

== Version history ==
=== Windows ===
The latest version of Picasa is 3.9, which supports Windows XP, Windows Vista, and Windows 7, and has Google+ integration for users of that service. Version 3.9 also removed integration with Picasa Web Albums for users of Google+.

=== Linux ===
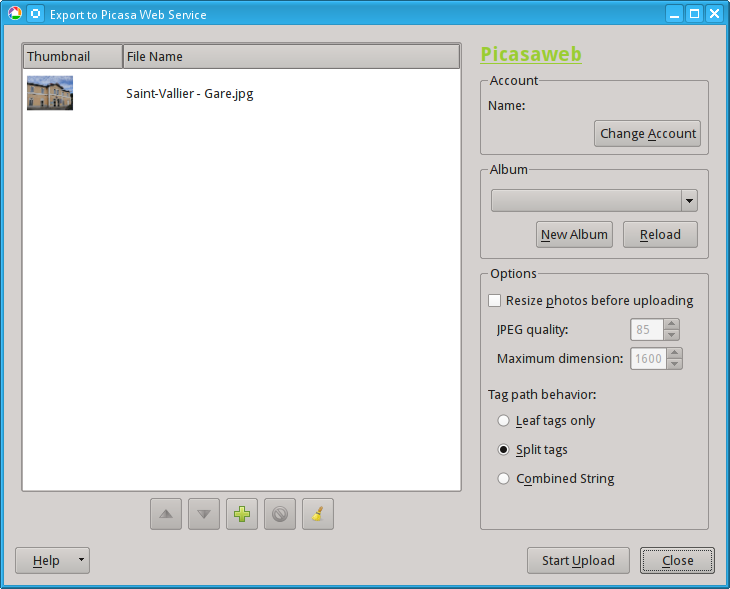
KDE Image Plugin Interface (KIPI) export to Picasaweb

Since June 2006, Linux versions have become available as free downloads for most distributions of the Linux operating system. It is not a native Linux program but an adapted Windows version that uses the Wine libraries. Google has announced that there will be no Linux version for 3.5. The only officially offered 3.x version of the software is Picasa 3.0 Beta for Linux.

On April 20, 2012, Google announced that they were deprecating Picasa for Linux and will no longer maintain it for Linux.

To use latest version of Picasa on Linux, Linux users can use Wine and install Picasa for Windows. Linux users can use other programs to upload to Picasa Web Albums, including Shotwell and Digikam.

=== Mac OS X ===
On January 5, 2009, Google released a beta version of Picasa for Mac (Intel-based Macs only). Also, a plugin is available for iPhoto to upload to the Picasa Web Albums hosting service. There is also a standalone Picasa Web Albums uploading tools for OS X 10.4 or later. The Picasa for Mac is a Google Labs release.

== Features ==
=== Organization and editing ===
For organizing photos, Picasa had file importing and tracking features, as well as tags, facial recognition, and collections for further sorting. It also offers several basic photo editing functions, including color enhancement, red eye reduction, and cropping. Other features include slide shows, printing, and image timelines. Images could also be prepared for external use, such as for e-mailing or printing, by reducing file size and setting up page layouts. There was also integration with online photo printing services. Other simple editing features included adding text to the image. Picasa supported Google's WebP image format as well as the JPG format and most Raw image format (RAW files). A user could view and edit RAW files and save the finished edit (as JPG, or other forms) without any changes to the original RAW file.

==== Keywords ====
Picasa used picasa.ini files to keep track of keywords for each image. In addition to this, Picasa attached IPTC Information Interchange Model (IPTC) keyword data to JPEG files, but not to any other file format. Keywords attached to JPEG files in Picasa could be read by other image library software like Adobe Photoshop Album, Adobe Bridge, Adobe Photoshop Lightroom, digiKam, Aperture, and iPhoto.

According to the Picasa Readme, Picasa could parse Extensible Metadata Platform (XMP) data. However, it could not search local files for existing XMP keywords.

==== Searching ====
Picasa had a search bar that was always visible when viewing the library. Searches were live, so that displayed items were filtered as one types. The search bar would search filenames, captions, tags, folder names, and other metadata.

Picasa also had an experimental feature that allowed searching for images that contain certain colors with the "color" operator.

=== Viewing ===
Picasa has no separate view window. There is only an "edit view" with a viewing area. Fullscreen view is available in slideshow mode, by holding down the ctrl+alt keys while in "edit view", or by pressing the Alt Gr key. This feature is also available through the context menu of Windows Explorer, and provides a way to start the Picasa editor as well.

=== Backup ===
In Picasa 2 and earlier versions, changes to pictures made in Picasa overwrite the original file, but a backup version of the original is saved in a hidden folder named "Originals" in the same folder as the original picture (.picasaoriginals on Mac OS X).

In Picasa 3, changes to pictures made in Picasa are saved to a hidden file picasa.ini in the same folder as the original picture. This allows multiple edits to be performed without altering the original image. Viewing the picture in Picasa or using the Picasa Photo Viewer will apply modifications on the fly, whereas viewing through other programs (such as Windows XP's Photo and Fax Viewer) will display the original image. Changes can also be made permanent using the "Save" function, where the original file is backed up in a hidden folder .picasaoriginals located in the same folder as the original picture and the modified version is written in its place.

=== Face recognition ===
On August 15, 2006, Google announced it had acquired Neven Vision, whose technology can be used to search for features within photos such as people or buildings. Google applied this technology for face recognition, and this functionality was launched on Picasa Web Albums on September 2, 2008.

Neven Vision incorporates several patents specifically centered around face recognition from digital photo and video images.

=== Geotagging ===
Since June 2007, Picasa can write geographic coordinates to Exif metadata, thus geotagging an image.

Since version 3.5 of Picasa, geotagging may be done directly inside Picasa, in the Places panel.

The geotagging functionality is described in the Picasa User's Guide.

== Other Picasa applications ==
=== Picasa Web Albums ===
Besides Google+, Picasa also integrated with Picasa Web Albums, an image hosting and sharing web service. The service allowed users with a Google account to store and share their photos on the service. Users with a Google+ account received unlimited storage for photos of a resolution less than 2048x2048 pixels; all others received unlimited storage for photos of a resolution less than 800x800.

=== Hello ===
Hello by Google's Picasa was a free computer program that enabled users to send images across the Internet and publish them to their blogs. It was similar to an instant messaging program because it allowed users to send text, but Hello focused on digital photographs. Users could opt to view the same pictures as their friends in real-time. One of the advantages claimed at the website is that photos could be shared through firewalls.

The service was canceled at the end of 2006, and users were instructed to try the Picasa "Blog This" functionality for uploading pictures to their blogs. According to the official website, the Hello project was shut down on May 15, 2008.

== Discontinuation ==
On February 12, 2016, Google announced that the Picasa desktop application would be discontinued on March 15, 2016, followed by the closure of the Picasa Web Albums service on May 1, 2016. Google stated that the primary reason for retiring Picasa was that it wanted to focus its efforts "entirely on a single photos service" the cross-platform, web-based Google Photos. While support for the desktop version of Picasa ended, Google stated that users who downloaded the software, or who chose to download it prior to the March 15th deadline could still be able to use its functionality, albeit with no support from Google.

== See also ==
- Google Photos
- Comparison of image viewers
- Desktop organizer
- List of Google products
- List of image-sharing websites
