= Infinite scrolling =

Approach to web design

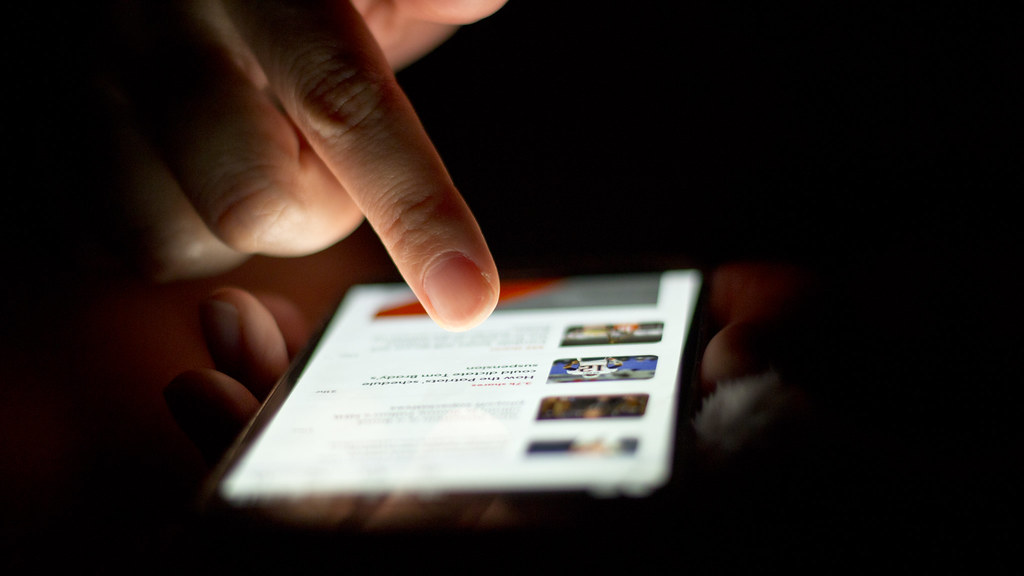
A person scrolling through news on a smartphone

Infinite scrolling, also known as endless scrolling, is an approach to web design where new material is continually dynamically added to the bottom of the page as the user scrolls downward, leading to the apparent ability to scroll forever. This is in contrast to pagination, where material is divided into discrete pages.

== History ==
Infinite scroll was filed as a patent application on 14 February 2006 by the Windows Live Image Search team (now known as Bing) at Microsoft. It was the first product to have infinite scroll on its release on 8 March 2006. The Microsoft engineering leader of image search at the time, Hugh Williams, has shared that Julie Farago, Nick Craswell, and he were the inventors of infinite scroll.

The US patent has the first recorded mention of "an infinite-scroll" component. The feature was built and internally tested throughout 2005, along with several other now discontinued features in the image search product including a slider to control thumbnail size, a scratchpad image-saving feature, and a hover-over feature that allowed users to explore image metadata.

In 2019, Aza Raskin, claimed to have invented infinite scroll. There is no evidence to support this claim that he created the prior art before Microsoft's patent filing.

== Variations ==
There are many variations of infinite scrolling, including:

Infinite scrolling with a button to load more content, giving the user more control over their browsing. An example of this is Google Search.

Infinite scrolling with integrated pagination, indicating to the user how far they have scrolled, an example of which being the mobile website of Google Shopping.

== Arguments ==
Usability research suggests infinite scrolling can present an accessibility issue.

The lack of stopping cues has been described as a pathway to smartphone addiction and social media addiction.

== See also ==
- Doomscrolling
- Problematic smartphone use
- Problematic social media use
- Story (social media)
- Instagram
- TikTok
- YouTube Shorts
- Reels (Meta)
