= YouTube Shorts =

Short-form section of video-sharing platform

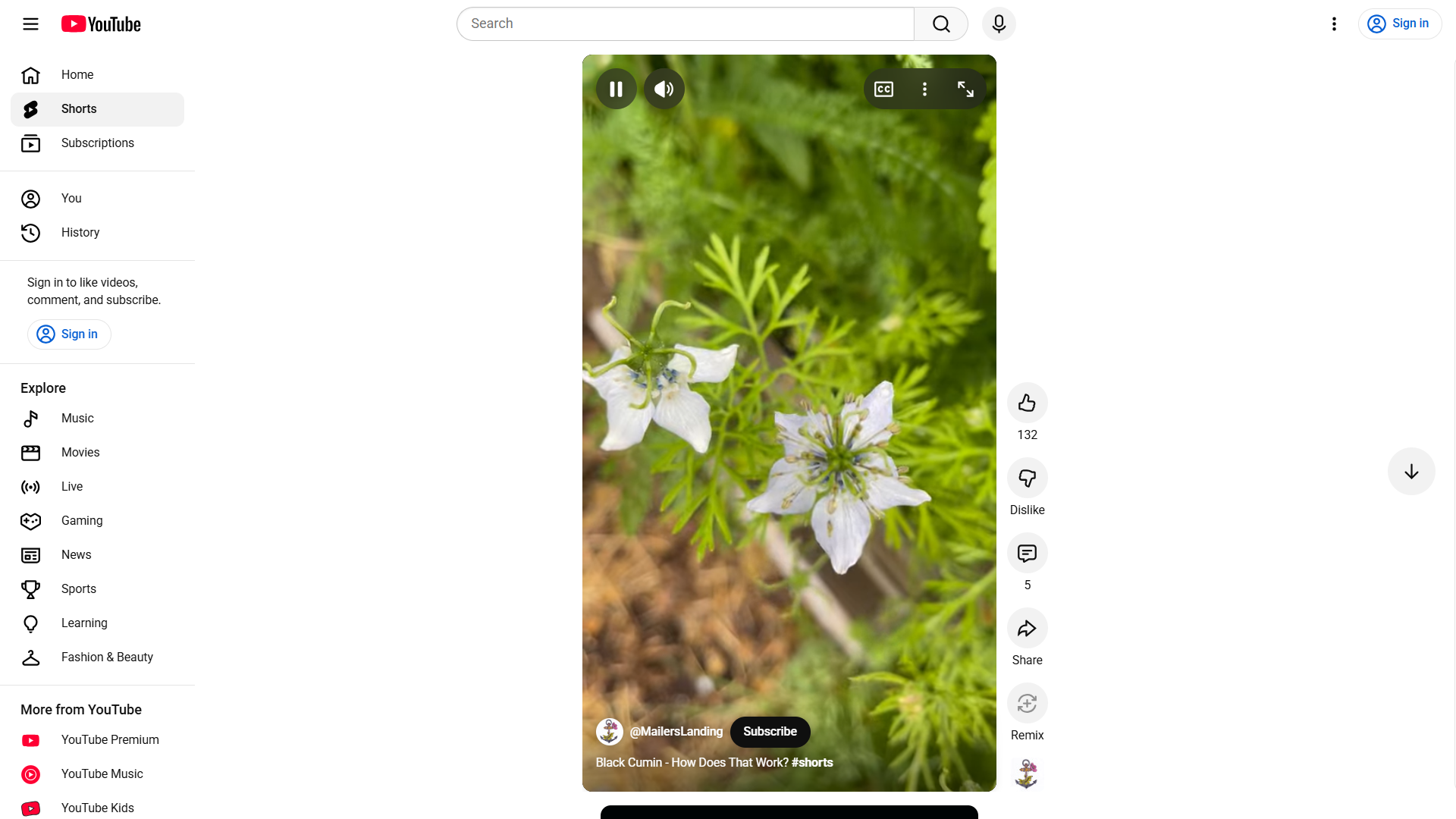
- Screenshot of the video player as of September 21, 2025
- Website type: Short-form
- Area served: Worldwide (excluding blocked countries)
- Owner: YouTube
- Industry: Internet
- Website: youtube.com/shorts
- IPv6 support: Yes
- Advertising: Google AdSense
- Launched: September 15, 2020; 6 years ago (India); July 12, 2021; 5 years ago (Worldwide)
- Content license: Uploader holds copyright (standard license); Creative Commons can be selected, just like regular YouTube videos.

YouTube Shorts is the short-form section of the American online video-sharing platform YouTube.

YouTube Shorts are short form vertical videos that have a duration of up to three minutes, and has various features for user interaction. Videos were limited to 60 seconds prior to September 2024. Creators earn money based on the amount of views they receive, typically a few cents per 1000 views or through Google Ads.

As of November 21, 2025, Shorts have collectively earned over 9 trillion views, almost 70 billion per day since the platform was made available to the general public on July 13, 2021, including views that pre-date the YouTube Shorts feature. The increased popularity of YouTube Shorts has led to concerns about addiction, especially for teenagers.

== History ==
A 2022 video of Endeavour docking at the ISS in a format suitable for YouTube Shorts.

YouTube's main intent in the creation of YouTube Shorts in 2019 was to compete with TikTok, an online video platform for short clips. The company started by experimenting with vertical videos up to a length of 30 seconds in their own section within the YouTube homepage. This early beta was released only to a small number of people.

Shortly after TikTok was banned in India on June 29, 2020, the YouTube Shorts beta was made available in India on September 15, 2020. In March 2021, the beta was released in the US and was later globally released on July 13, 2021.

In August 2022, YouTube announced plans to make the Shorts feature available on its smart TV app. YouTube also began highlighting Shorts separately in its year-end summaries, indicating the feature's growing prominence.

At the annual Made on YouTube event in New York on September 21, 2023, Google announced YouTube Create, a video editing app designed for YouTube creators, to facilitate the growth of Shorts. At launch, the app is available on Android and an iOS version released in December 2025.

In September 2024, YouTube announced that Shorts would be able to be up to 3 minutes, and from then on all vertical videos 3 minutes of length or shorter would be turned into Shorts.

In March 2025, TikTok users tried to create a trend planning to "colonize" YouTube Shorts on March 25, due to a phenomenon known as "meme drought".

In 2025, YouTube began applying AI filters, without user permission, on videos uploaded to YouTube Shorts.

In October 2025, YouTube App introduced an option to set a daily limit for amount of time user views YouTube Shorts feed, ranging from 15 minutes to 2 hours. This option is limited only to YouTube mobile app and not available on the web site.

In April 2026, YouTube expanded the Shorts feed limit feature to allow setting a 0 minute limit. This option prevents users from viewing any content in the Shorts section, but does not hide it completely.

In June 2026, YouTube made a change to the Shorts feed by removing the dislike button and replacing the thumbs-up icon like button to a heart icon to match it like TikTok and Instagram Reels. This change was to make users instead choose either "Not interested" or "Don't recommend to this channel" to tune their feed and serve up content.

In July 2026, YouTube added a Save button for Shorts. Tapping the button once adds a Short to the default "Saved Shorts" playlist. Tapping it again allows users to add the Short to other playlists they own or collaborate on, or to remove it from any of those playlists. Like the "Liked Videos" playlist, the "Saved Shorts" playlist is linked to the user's account.

In October 2026, Youtube allowed selected GIF's in the comment section.

== Features ==
YouTube Shorts presents user-generated vertical or square videos up to 180 seconds long. It allows users to add licensed music and on-screen captions. Viewers can scroll through an endless feed of videos algorithmically tailored for the user. Although intended to be watched on smartphones, YouTube Shorts can be viewed on all other devices.

YouTube Shorts includes features that are similar to those of TikTok, such as live videos, "collabs", easy editing tools, and playlists. It also includes tools that edit long-form YouTube videos into YouTube Shorts. YouTube Shorts offers creators the ability to interact with viewers by responding to comments with additional videos, a feature primarily made popular by TikTok. Shorts creators can also use stickers to interact with their audience through formats such as Q&As. The Financial Times reports that fewer than 10 percent of creators use YouTube's editing tools for Shorts. Many use TikTok's tools instead, though videos with TikTok branding are downgraded from YouTube's platform.

YouTube Shorts added a feature that sends default reminders to users ages 13 to 17 to take a break or go to bed due to the increase in young users. There is currently no measure to restrict the use of the application.

== Usage ==
Since its inception in 2019, the usage of YouTube Shorts has continuously increased. In September 2022, Alphabet announced that YouTube Shorts generated over 30 billion views daily. As of November 2025, that number has increased further, now being over 100 billion views daily. The number of monthly users has also increased from 1.5 billion in 2022 to around the 4 billion mark as of 2025.

The popularity of YouTube Shorts has caused some concerns within the company, with some believing that it will "cannibalize" YouTube's long-form video content. YouTube's official response is that Shorts is designed to be an additional format option for creators.

A recent study from UNIL, Indiana University and Google revealed that YouTube Shorts is taking over regular videos as they are more frequent. However, they mostly target entertaining content and regular videos still outperform Shorts in education and politics related content.

== Monetization ==
In August 2021, YouTube released the YouTube Shorts fund, a system in which the top Shorts creators could get paid for their work. YouTube described this as a way to "monetize and reward creators for their content" and said it would be a $100 million fund distributed throughout 2021 and 2022, similar to TikTok's $1 billion creator fund. YouTube told The Hollywood Reporter that the fund is "just a stopgap until YouTube develops a long-term monetization and support tool for short-form creators".

In September 2022, YouTube announced that Shorts would become part of the YouTube Partner Program starting in February 2023. The program allows eligible creators to receive a share of the ad revenue. Partnered YouTube channels can also use the 'members' and 'supers' features that allow users to pay a monthly subscription for the content or a one time donation respectively.

YouTube Shorts creators receive a percentage of ad money earned on ads that play before and after their videos similar to YouTube. Creators on YouTube Shorts earn 45 percent of the ad money, while creators on YouTube earn 55 percent.

According to the YouTube policies, creators who upload content with some degree of copyright infringement, non-original content, or other violations of the community guidelines will not be eligible for monetization.

== Health risks ==
Researchers from the Guizhou University of Finance and Economics and Western Michigan University found that short-form video platforms like YouTube Shorts and TikTok may make it easier for young adults and children to develop addictive behavior because short-form videos provide "short bursts of thrills." These researchers found that college students in the US and China watch short-form videos for entertainment, knowledge, and to build social identities.

The Wall Street Journal reported that some parents are concerned about the effects of short-form videos on their children, as there is no way to disable YouTube Shorts or set limits. When children watch short-form videos, they learn to expect continual stimulation and fast-paced changes, which can cause problems in the future when engaging in activities that require greater focus, such as reading.

Recent studies connect short-form videos such as YouTube Shorts to the brain's reward system, specifically dopamine release. According to Dr. Anna Lembke, a psychiatrist and chief of Stanford University's dual diagnosis addiction clinic, brief attention-grabbing videos are powerful stimuli, triggering dopamine surges like other addictive behaviors. The rapid and easily consumable nature of short-form videos can elicit high levels of dopamine; since dopamine serves as a motivator rather than a direct source of pleasure, individuals are compelled to seek rewarding activities and become addicted to them. Such neurochemical responses lead to addictive patterns and behaviors, entering a vicious cycle. Digital addiction can lead to shorter attention spans and slower cognitive processing.

== See also ==
- TikTok
- Instagram Reels
- Facebook Reels
