= Picasa Web Albums =

Image sharing service from Google

- Other names: PWA
- Developer: Google
- Release: June 6, 2006; 20 years ago
- Final release: Final version (Service retired) / May 1, 2016
- Operating system: Web-based
- Platform: Any web browser
- Successor: Google Photos
- Type: Photo hosting, sharing, and storage service
- License: Freeware (for hosting and sharing)
- Website: picasaweb.google.com

Picasa Web Albums (PWA) was an image hosting and sharing web service from Google, often compared to Flickr and similar sites. The service links with Google's photo organizing desktop program Picasa. It was discontinued in May 2016 and succeeded by Google Photos which does not support sharing photo albums on the public world wide web.

It allowed users with a Google account to store and share photos in public albums with an initial free storage offering of 15 GB, that is shared with Gmail and Google Drive. Storage was unlimited for photos of resolution less than 2048x2048 pixels for Google+ users, and for photos of resolution less than 800x800 for everyone else. Videos shorter than 15 minutes also don't count towards the limit. Once the storage is full, uploaded photos are automatically resized to fit the resolution for unlimited storage.

On February 12, 2016, Google announced that the service as well as the application will be discontinued on May 1, 2016 and March 15, 2016, respectively. Existing users of the application will still be able to use the application. Existing users of the service were advised to use Google Photos, which already stores the photos in Picasa Web Albums and is a new place for viewing, downloading and deleting (but not editing or organizing) the albums along with their meta-data will be created in the future.

== Features ==
Users may upload pictures through a variety of ways: via the PWA web interface on supported browsers, Picasa 2.5 or later on Microsoft Windows, using the Exporter for iPhoto, the Aperture to Picasa Web Albums plug-in, Uploader on Mac OS X, F-Spot on Linux, or through WAManager in the Amiga-like OS MorphOS. In both free and paid accounts, the actual resolution of the photo is maintained, even though a smaller resolution photo may be displayed by the web interface.

In Picasa 3 versions of the software, using the 'original size' upload option, pixel size remains the same, but JPEG compression is increased significantly during upload to PWA. As JPEG is a "lossy" format, some picture information (and quality) is lost. Picasa 3.6 added an option to preserve original JPEG quality.

PWA uses an "unlisted number" approach for URLs for private photo albums. This enables a user to email a private album's URL to anyone, and the recipient can view the album without having to create a user account. This is done via an "authentication key" that must be appended to the URL for the album to be shown. The Picasa Help files say that private albums are not searchable by anyone except the user. Another visibility option named "sign-in required to view" is available. This makes the album viewable only to those with whom the album is explicitly shared.

Ads are shown on the free Picasa Web Albums accounts. The Terms of Service permit Google to use the uploaded photos to display on their website or via RSS feeds, and also for promoting Google services royalty-free. Additionally, the terms permit Google to allow other companies with which they are affiliated to use the uploaded pictures to provide syndicated services. This allowance is perpetual and cannot be revoked by the owner of the photos.

Picasa Web Albums was first leaked on June 6, 2006. When introduced, it came with 250 MB of free space. On March 7, 2007, that was upgraded to 1 GB. As stated above, storage was unlimited for small and resized photos as of May 2012. Users can rent additional storage space (shared between Gmail, Google Drive and Picasa Web Albums) through a paid monthly subscription plan. Plans are available from 15 GB (free) to 30 TB (US$299.99 per month).

Although users can create secure web albums, Google refuses to fix an error that started with their 'upgrade' to Google+: an Unlisted Gallery link does not display correctly unless the viewer is logged into a google account. Previously, users could share their Unlisted Gallery link with anyone, Google user or not.

On February 12, 2016, Google announced that the Picasa desktop application would be discontinued on March 15, 2016, followed by the closure of the Picasa Web Albums service on May 1, 2016. Google stated that the primary reason for retiring Picasa was that it wanted to focus its efforts "entirely on a single photos service" the cross-platform, web-based Google Photos. While support for the desktop version of Picasa is ending, Google has stated that users who have downloaded the software, or who choose to download it prior to the March 15, 2016 deadline will still be able to use its functionality, albeit with no support from Google.
