= Facebook Stories =

Facebook service for photo and video collections

Facebook Stories are short user-generated photo or video collections that can be uploaded to the user's Facebook. Facebook Stories were created on March 28, 2017. They are considered a second news feed for the social media website. It is focused around Facebook's in-app camera which allows users to add fun filters and Snapchat-like lenses to their content as well as add visual geolocation tags to their photos and videos. The content is able to be posted publicly on the Facebook app for only 24 hours or can be sent as a direct message to a Facebook friend.

"As people mostly post photos and videos, Stories is the way they’re going to want to do it," says Facebook Camera product manager Connor Hayes, noting Facebook's shift away from text status updates after ten years as its primary sharing option. "Obviously we’ve seen this doing very well in other apps. Snapchat has really pioneered this," explained Hayes. Facebook has seen much success through other applications like Snapchat and Instagram, especially since Facebook bought Instagram for $1 billion in 2012.

== History ==
After the many failed attempts of trying to incorporate Snapchat-like features on Facebook, (date=January 2018) the company decided to test run Messenger Day. In 2016, Facebook created a feature called Messenger Day, which allowed users to post videos and pictures with filters for 24 hours only. This project was only used in Poland because of the unpopularity of Snapchat in that region. Users are able to add texts and colorful graphics. However, this was only a test for Facebook to be later turned into a feature on Facebook's app.

Facebook's introduction of the Story function may have been in response to the wider success of Instagram Story advertising over the advertising on Facebook Wall; Instagram Story ads were found to be more successful than Facebook Wall advertising in all demographics aside from non-millennial men.

== Popularity and criticism ==
As of 2017, Facebook Stories is much less popular among social media users than Snapchat and Instagram. In August 2016, Instagram stories, which is a part of the Facebook owned Instagram, was created and as of June 2017, had 250 million active users. Mark Zuckerberg states, "It is important to release products that people are familiar with, but (Facebook Stories) is going to have the first mainstream augmented reality platform."

In a campaign to get more Facebook users to use Facebook Stories, "Facebook is turning friends into ghosts who aren’t using stories. So, instead of the blank space that used to be there above the news feed, Facebook will show grayed-out icons of some frequently contacted friends, regardless of whether they’ve ever posted to their Facebook story before."

Plugin extensions to Chrome. and Firefox. have been written specifically to hide Facebook stories. As of September 2019, Facebook itself has so far not created an off option for its users.

== Features ==
=== Access Stories ===
There are two ways that a user can view Facebook Stories. First, by scrolling to the top of the feed, the users are able to view their friends' Stories and create a story. Second, swipe right from any screen on the Facebook app. Users can "like" Stories and reply to them.

=== Saving Stories ===
Before uploading content to a story, users are able to save it to the camera roll. Once users are done creating the story, press the down arrow to save on the camera roll, or the center arrow to share. Users are able to send a direct message to any friends, post to a timeline or add to a Story.

=== Views ===
If users post a story to a timeline it will appear at the top of the profile as if it were any other picture or video. Similar to posting to a Timeline, users can decide who sees the story (Public, Friends and so on). But posting a story to a "Story" will make it available to all friends for a 24-hour period and will appear as a bubble at the top of their feeds. Users cannot restrict which Friends see a Story.

=== Tools ===
Facebook is the first app to have animated face filters. The company worked with artists Hattie Stewart and Douglas Coupland to design original filters for the Facebook app. To access lenses, swipe up and down, but users have to apply them before recording or taking a picture, which is a key difference between Facebook stories and Snapchat. As well as video stories being 20 seconds and being able to replay a friend's direct message.

List of what is included in Facebook Camera:

- Drawing with resizable marker and chalk brushes
- Emoji stickers Colored captions
- Animated selfie lenses and masks
- Environmental effects like highlight lines and funhouse mirrors
- Reactive filters that respond to movement like lava lamp colors
- Alternative filters that surprise you with new effects if you get more people in frame
- Fine-art-style transfers that make your images look like line drawings or impressionist paintings
- Professional artist filters like Hattie Stewart's doodle bombs and Doug Copeland's psychedelia
- Licensed filters from six movie studios, including a Minions filter
- Cause-supporting filters like rainbows for gay pride
- Geotagged location filters for certain places
- Country-specific filters for around ten initial markets
