= Oddly satisfying videos =

Genre of internet video clips

Pressure washing is one subject of oddly satisfying videos.

Glitter slime is commonly featured in satisfying videos.

Oddly satisfying videos are internet videos that portray repetitive events or actions that viewers find pleasing. Common subjects include domino shows, parlor tricks, slime, pressure washing, hydraulic presses, scrap metal shredders, soap cutting, paint mixing, and dental filling. They are viewed as forms of escapism or ASMR.

The term "oddly satisfying video" emerged on the internet forum Reddit after the /r/oddlysatisfying subreddit was established in 2013. The label is now widespread on online video platforms such as YouTube and Instagram. Wired UK called slime, a common feature of these videos, the "biggest DIY trend of 2017, even causing a national shortage of glue in the US". In 2021, The Guardian wrote that "the pandemic, coupled with an increasingly chaotic news cycle, has us striving towards the ultimate #smoothbrain state – meaning there’s a global audience regularly seeking out the oddly satisfying, and a huge wave of content creators actively manufacturing it".

The appeal of oddly satisfying videos is thought to lie in the human preference for symmetry, patterns and repetition, the interest of exploring the behavior of materials, or hand movements. It may be related to the autonomous sensory meridian response, a pleasant tingling sensation in the neck and scalp. Evan Malone, a professor of art and film philosophy, theorized that the appeal may lie in their portrayal of everyday experiences as cinematic and, in Baudrillard's words, "hyper-real". The effect of watching such videos has been described as a "brain massage" or "lightly hypnotizing", and as a form of psychological self-care to help overcome stress or anxiety. The satisfaction derived may have to do with mirror neurons, which fire when one performs a motion or watches someone else perform a motion.
