= Reels (Meta) =

Short-form video sharing platform

Reels is a short-form video-sharing platform displaying an infinite feed of videos including music, audio, and artificial effects. The platform is offered by Facebook and Instagram, online social networking services owned by the American company Meta Platforms. Similar to their main services, the platform hosts user-generated content, but it only allows for pieces to be 90 seconds long and have a 9:16 aspect ratio, and Meta AI started showing reels since 2023.

== History ==
In November 2019, Meta started testing Reels in Brazil. In March 2021, Facebook started experimenting with showing vertical videos up to 30 seconds for US and India users. In April 2021, it was launched officially for Brazil, and started being tested in Australia and Germany as well. Facebook Reels was originally released in United States in September 2021, following India's TikTok ban. Later on Facebook Reels was globally released in February 2022, after releases in 150 countries. The video length was increased to 90 seconds in March 2023, and in December Meta AI started supporting reels, and expanding in 2026 with personalized ads and improving reels based on data of users' chats.

== Bonus ==
Facebook launched the Reels Play Bonus program as "Challenges" program on Facebook in October 2021 as a way to reward outstanding Reels creators. Facebook announced a $1 billion initiative for 2021–2022 to support creators through the Reels Play Bonus program." The Reels Play Bonus program initially was the creators of United States, Canada and Mexico. Later Facebook expanded their Reels Play Bonus program to more countries for select group of people and the program is invite-only.

=== Requirements ===
According to Meta Platforms, Facebook has introduced a new way to let creators participating in the Reels Play Bonus program, earn up to $4,000 per month. Meta clarifies:

- Each month, creators can take part in a number of consecutive, cumulative challenges. Earn $20 once each of your five reels has received 100 plays.
- A creator can unlock a new challenge once they complete the current one. As a result, after finishing the previous example, they would receive a new one that read: Receive $100 when 20 of your Reels accumulate 500 plays each.
- At the beginning of each 30-day bonus period, Challenge progress will be reset to #1.

== Monetization ==
Facebook began testing an ad monetization platform for Reels content in February 2022, giving users another way to make money off of their work. Facebook said that Reels monetization would be implemented gradually. By the middle of March, practically all the countries that currently have an in-stream ads monetization program will be able to access overlay advertisements on Facebook Reels. The overlay ads will be available in two formats that are Banner ads and Sticker ads.

== See also ==
- Facebook Watch
- Instagram Reels
- Facebook Stories
