= Muslim meme =

Type of Internet meme

Muslim memes, also called Islamic memes or Halal memes, are one type of Internet meme which usually contain calls for adherence to Islamic religious teachings.

Most Muslim memes contain calls to adhere to Islamic teachings, or to stay away from prohibitions in Islam. In their presentation, it is not uncommon for Muslim memes to offend their readers in order to remind them of their religious duties.

== Origin and development ==
It is not known where the first Islamic memes were introduced. However, there are several types of Muslim memes that are known to have emerged earlier than others.

=== "Stay Halal Brother" ===
One of the earliest representations of Islamic memes is the phrase "Stay halal brother" which is usually combined with a poster of the Indian Muslim preacher Zakir Naik or the starfish character Patrick Star.

Some memes are made using Islamic words against the background of the animated film characters SpongeBob SquarePants. Trends like this can usually be found in Indonesia.

=== Tung Tung Tung Sahur ===
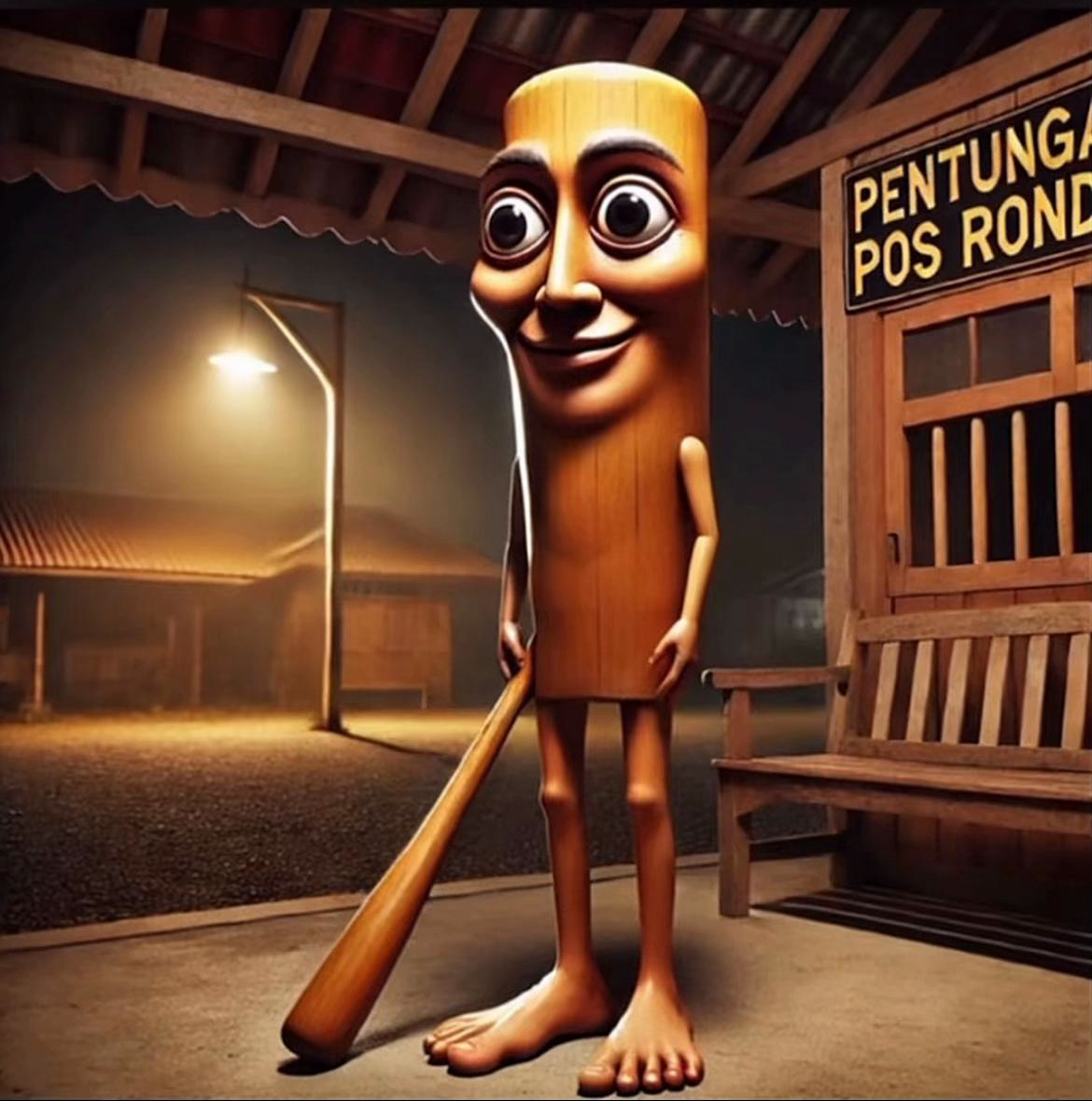
Tung Tung Tung Sahur, depicted as a slit drum (kentongan) carrying a baseball bat, punishes anyone who refuses to wake up for suhur.

In early 2025, Italian brainrot memes became viral on TikTok. Italian brainrot featured animals mixed with objects. An example of the trend was the character named Tung Tung Tung Sahur, which was first posted by @noxaasht in February 2025. Tung Tung Tung Sahur is depicted as a kentongan. Although considered part of Italian brainrot, it has Indonesian origin. The "Tung Tung Tung" in its name is onomatopoeia of how Indonesians traditionally beat kentungan slit drums to commence suhur, the pre-dawn meal that Muslims eat before fasting during Ramadan. The word tung also means "rumbling" in Sundanese, spoken in Indonesia.

== Usage ==
Islamic memes can be found widely on social media such as Instagram, YouTube, WhatsApp, and others.

== Reception ==
The majority of Muslims generally accept the use of Islamic memes as a means of introducing Islam to the world. Some information experts from Indonesia regard Islamic memes as a means of preaching religion in a practical and easy way.

== See also ==
- Humour in Islam
- Image macro
