= Culture of Jember =

Jember is a regency of East Java province, Indonesia.

== Patrol ==
Patrol is one of the traditional music arts that became famous and spread in East Java, especially in Jember. Patrol uses a simple musical instrument, that is the kentongan. Patrol uses various sizes of kentongan and it is sounded regularly to produce a beautiful and pleasant tone. Besides using the kentongan, the player may be accompanied by the seruling. This is what differentiates Patrol Music with Tongtong Music from Madura which uses saronen as wind instruments.

Patrol started from Jember people's habits in the past when many liked to keep pigeons. From that habit, some people became accustomed to percussion musical instruments. At first, it was only used as a method to call pigeons. When people who kept pigeons increased, these percussion musical instruments developed into a distinct rhythm. As time went by, Patrol developed to become a folk music and became a communication device. Then, Patrol also developed as the music of the plantation guards. Patrol developed further during the holy month of Ramadan to awaken the citizens at meal time (sahur), because the majority of citizens of Jember are Muslims.

Patrol is usually played in groups with various sizes of kentongan. Each size has a different tone, so the arrangement of each tone is very important in Patrol Music. kentongan instruments are usually made of bamboo and wood. The ones which are made of bamboo are usually smaller in size and have a squeaky sound. When it made of wood, it should be bigger, the voice is deep, and loud as well. The patrol music performance needs both bamboo and wooden kentongan in various sizes to make a typical harmony of patrol.

A patrol music performance has all kinds of kentongan which collaborate to become one serving of a beautiful music instrument. Each performance usually brings some songs which are packed with the typical style of Patrol Music. The songs are usually folk songs, songs for playing traditional games, and even a modern one like dangdut or campursari. All songs which are performed are packaged in the style of Patrol music.

In Jember, there are many patrol groups, but each of them has their own creativity. It can be from the instrument, music arrangement, costume and performance. From the instrumental aspect, there some groups that added another music instrument such as jidor, ketipung, plastic drum, angklung, etc. They added the instruments as creation in order to make the sound more various and different from the other groups. From a costume aspect, each patrol group has their own creativity. They usually wear their regional dress, traditional clothes, or a costume from their own design in order to make their group more unique and interesting.

Before 2001, the Jember regency government paid less attention to Patrol music. There was not much effort put forth by government to develop this traditional music. Neither training programs nor competitions were held by the government to attract the Jember artists interested in order to developing the cultural. Each specific event or Ramadan they played in their area. Realizing it through UKM artistic Jember University efforts to maintain and preserve the culture. On 7–9 November 2001, Art UKM Jember University first organized a music festival of patrol. Ultimately UKM artistic Jember University routinely held music festivals patrol. Starting from Jember University's main road, the Patrol group is started to play their music. After that they left one by one to wander the Jember streets and play music with the melodic patrol to awaken and accompany the residents until dawn.

== Jember Fashion Carnaval ==
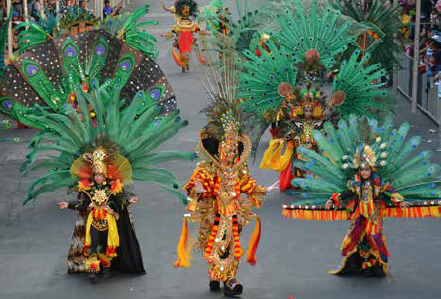
Jember Fashion Carnaval 2019

Jember Fashion Carnaval is an annual event. In the tenth carnival in 2011, over 600 participants walked along the world's longest catwalk. It ran for 3.6 kilometres (2.2 mi), along on Sudirman Street (Central Park) and Gajah Mada Street up to Jember Sport Hall.
