= Soviet brainrot =

Russian AI-generated Internet memes

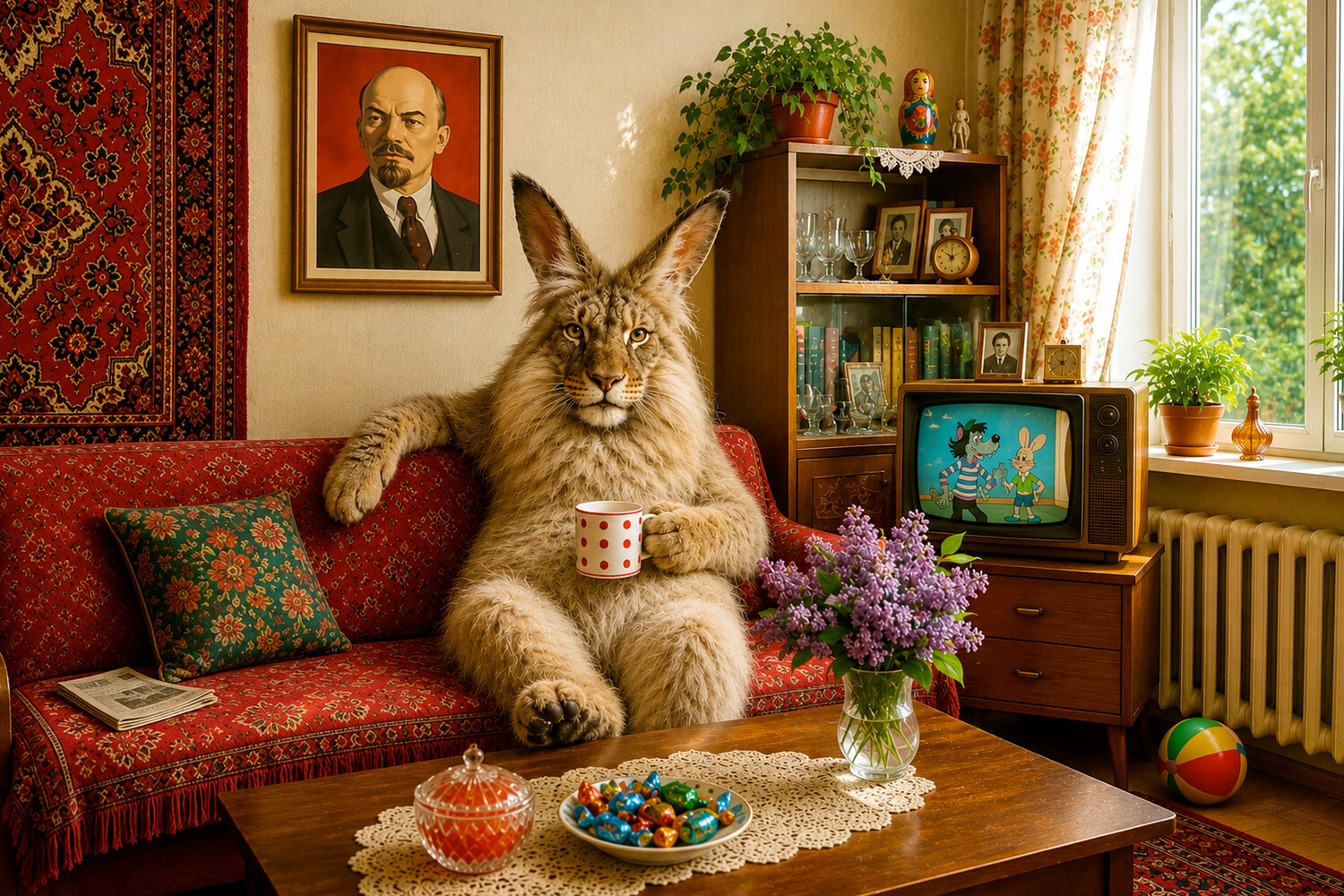
AI-generated Soviet brainrot image featuring Cheremsha in a Soviet apartment

"In the Soviet Union, people lived quietly, without hurry or fuss" (Russian: В Советском Союзе жили тихо, не спеша, без суеты), also known as Soviet brainrot (Советский брейнрот), is a series of Internet memes (of "brain rot" type) characterized by surrealist and absurd images of various aspects of the Soviet Union, accompanied by voiceovers that often employ puns or tongue twisters. It emerged as a parody of AI-generated videos that capitalized on nostalgia for the Soviet Union and became popular in early 2026. The memes became popular on the Runet, going viral on TikTok.

== History ==
In early 2020s, moralizing videos that capitalize on USSR nostalgia gained popularity among the older generation who lived through the Soviet era. In October 2025, an AI-generated video showing how belyashi were made in the USSR was published on YouTube, garnering nearly 5 million views, with casual viewers praising the video, highlighting the voiceover that resembled a Soviet announcer. More similar nostalgic videos were released in early 2026, with entire channels being created for proliferation of such content. These videos played on nostalgia for the USSR, portraying the Soviet era in an exclusively positive light, and often featured clichéd phrases such as "with gentle confidence", "with a warm quietness within", "almost inaudibly", "with a faint smile", "as if for the first time, with quiet joy" and "quietly, without hurry or fuss"; the latter phrase became synonymous with the meme and illustrated AI's tendency to overuse synonyms and tautologies when generating text.

The nostalgic videos were mocked online for their formulaic nature and clearly AI-generated writing. The negative reception led to parody videos, which became popular on TikTok. As the meme proliferated, the storylines became more absurd and recurring characters began appearing, akin to Italian brainrot creatures, such as a rabbit–lion hybrid named Cheremsha taken from the French project Les Créatonautes.

== Description ==
Soviet brainrot videos are stylized after Soviet documentaries and propaganda posters, and typically last 1–2 minutes. They feature a retrofuturistic view of the Soviet Union with absurd plots, such as Soviet people swimming in a nuclear reactor, eating shingle with Guttalin, and drinking sulfuric acid from a faceted glass. The videos often feature goods that were supposedly in short supply yet vital for Soviet citizens, such as glass wool, concrete blocks, or enriched uranium, portraying Soviet life as within extreme poverty.

The imagery is often accompanied by the Alexey Rybnikov song "Tatyana's Dreams" from the 1978 film A Dog Was Walking on the Piano, as well as monologues typically in the style of a Soviet documentary narrator. The monologue usually begins with the phrase "In the Soviet Union..." and continues with clichéd phrases, such as "everything was done quietly, without hurry or fuss", or turns them into puns, such as "without hurry, or fuss, or huss, or bus". The accompanying text mocks typical nostalgic statements from the Soviet generation, such as "things used to be better".

=== Examples ===
- Cheremsha (Russian: Черемша, lit. 'ramson') – a rabbit–lion hybrid and the central image of Soviet brainrot. Depicted as a national symbol, he served as an all-purpose helper, acting as a judge, a hat, an elevator, a building insulation material, a space rocket, or as the whole Soviet Union.
- Brdyshch (Russian: Брдыщ) – a fish–dog hybrid that can be depicted competing with Cheremsha for territory or coexisting peacefully. A prominent political figure, he banned hunger, labeling it a "petty bourgeois weakness".
- Syomga (Russian: Сёмга, lit. 'atlantic salmon') – a rabbit–tiger hybrid that lives in radiators, heating the apartments of Soviet citizens. He serves as a premium alternative to Cheremsha for people "with connections".
- Petrovich (Russian: Петрович, a common Russian patronym) – a Soviet mechanic in greasy work clothes, portrayed as an archetypal "real Soviet dude" who likes watching TV and can fix a nuclear reactor with a wrench.
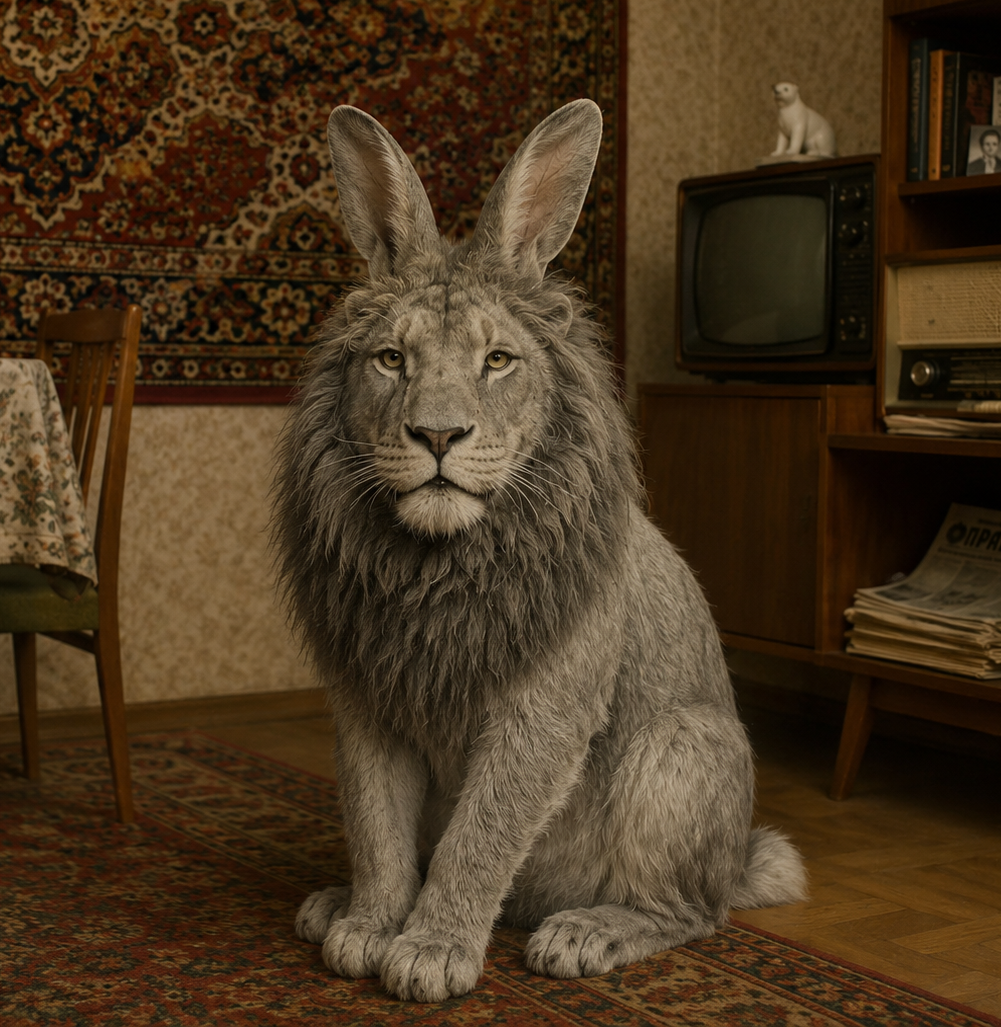
Cheremsha

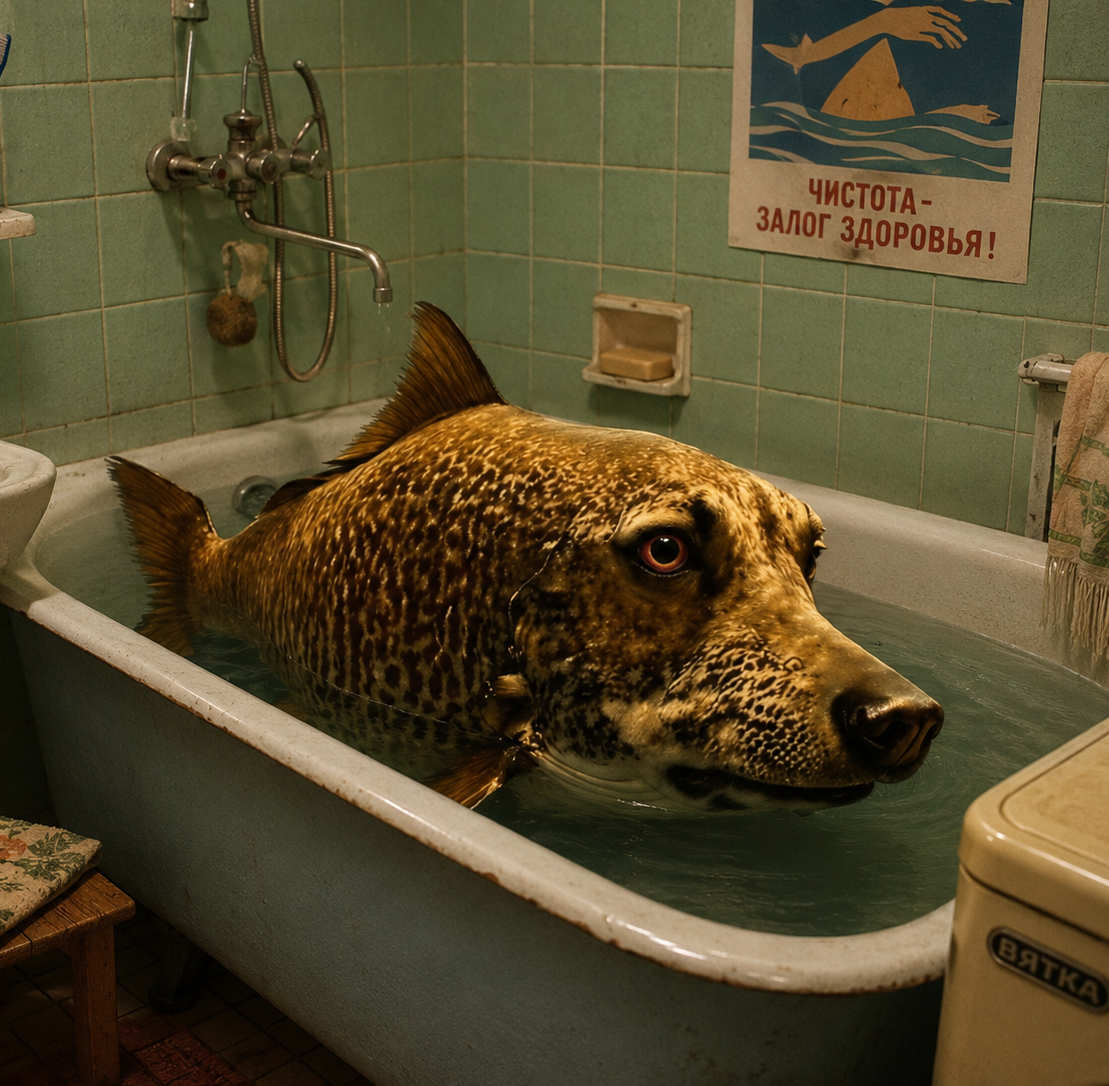
Brdyshch

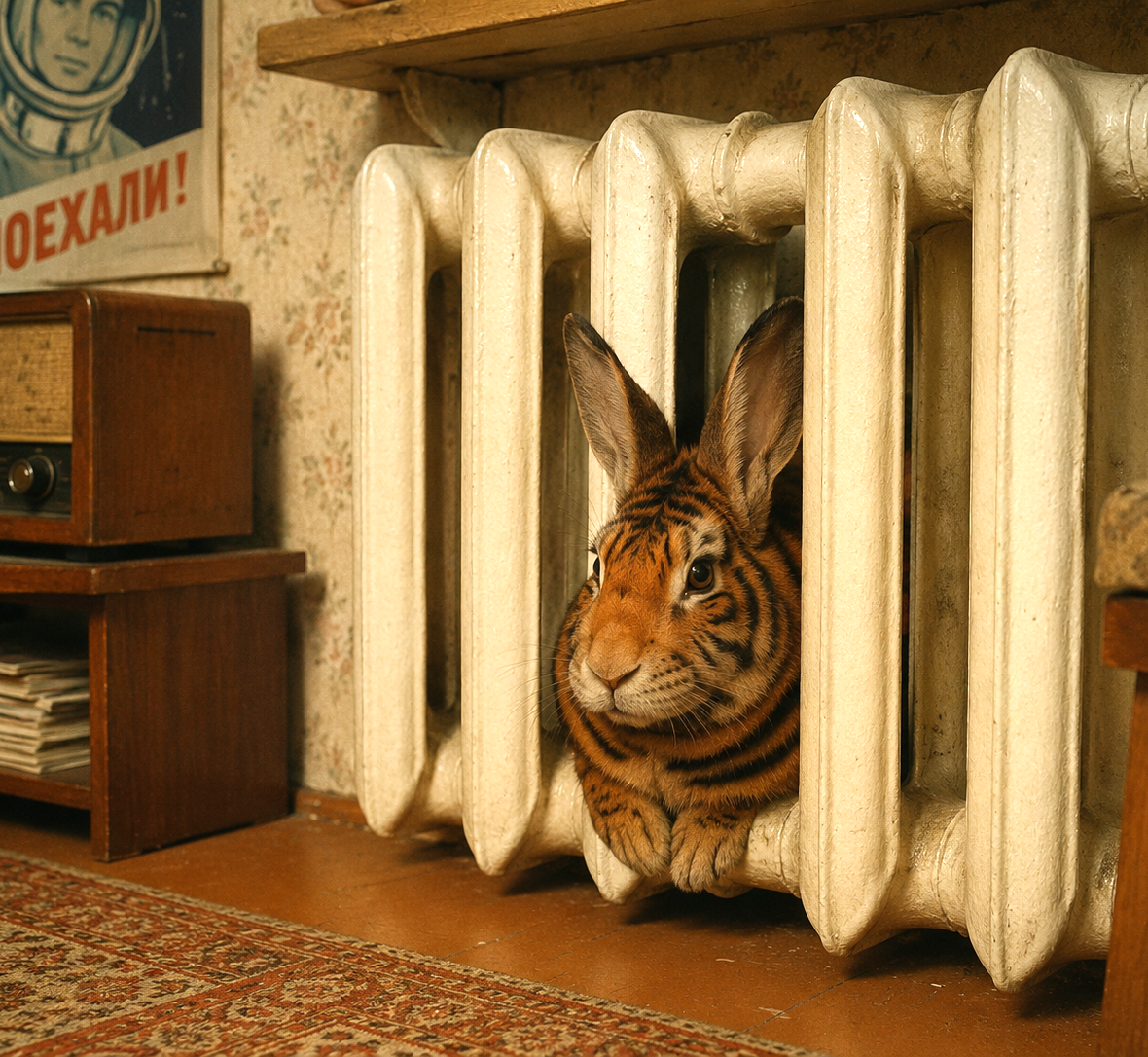
Syomga

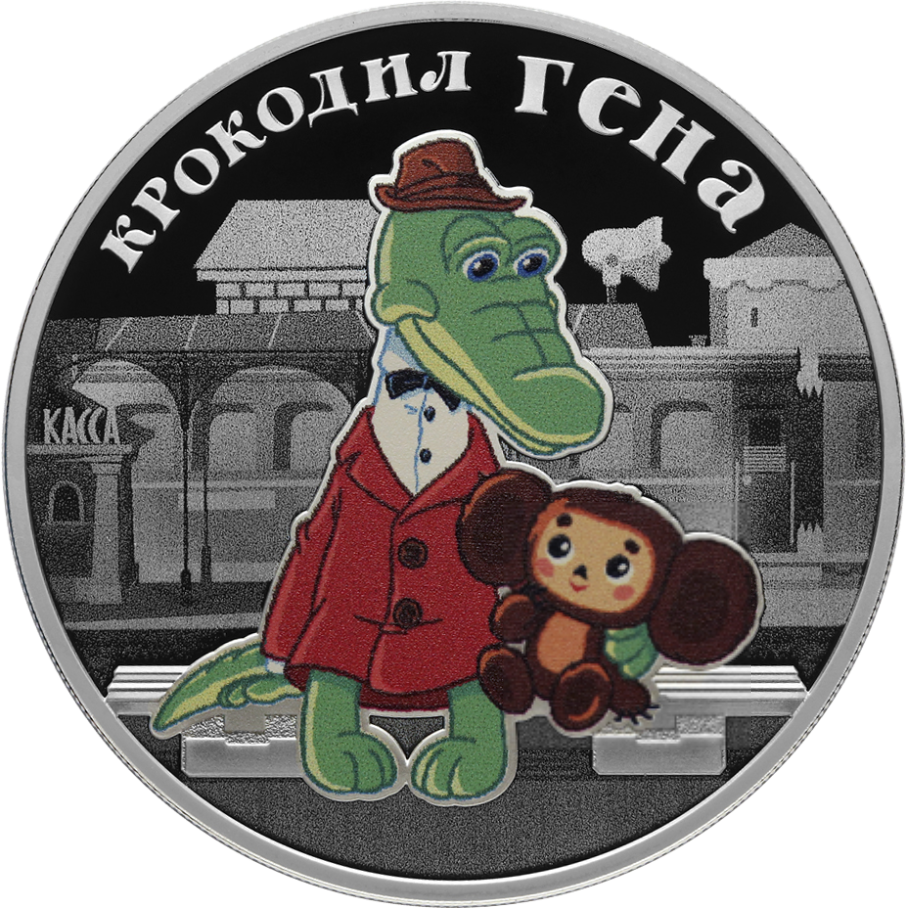
"Late-Soviet brainrot"

Russian political philosopher Aleksandr Dugin, in his article Cheburashka, or the Metaphysics of Disintegration, described big-eared Cheburashka as "late-Soviet brainrot".

== Reception ==
The RBK Group editorial team and representatives of the OTV channel named Soviet brainrot the biggest Russian cultural internet phenomenon of 2026. Gazeta.ru editor Karina Khalikova described the memes as a prime example of brainrot that went viral due to TikTok algorithms, drawing clear parallels to the Italian brainrot trend that took off in 2025, which was driven by AI-generated images and videos. Metro Moscow newspaper saw a clear parallel between Soviet brainrot and Alice's Adventures in Wonderland, stating that both phenomena emerged as parodies of moralizing.

Mel described Soviet brainrot videos as an unusual phenomenon, as the Soviet era is typically romanticized and glorified in present-day Russia rather than mocked. The videos were likened a modern interpretation of the phrase "Russia is the Motherland of Elephants", a saying that once mocked the Soviet press' attempts to attribute the scientific achievements of other countries to the Soviet Union. Nasha Niva described Soviet brainrot as an ironic reaction by Russian and Belarusian schoolchildren to propaganda that portrays the Soviet Union as a "paradisiacal, fairytale-like place".

The older generation's reaction to the online videos was mixed. Some users missed the humorous intent and tried to argue in the comments that such things never happened, leading to sarcastic replies proving otherwise, while other users were outraged by the content of the videos.

== See also ==
- AI slop
- Italian brainrot
- Tung Tung Tung Sahur
- "Sigma Boy"
- Skuf
