= Imsakiah =

Table of prayer and imsak times for Ramadan

Imsakiah (Egyptian Arabic: إمساكية رمضان) is a schedule that includes all prayer times, Iftar and Suhur, and the number of fasting hours during the day. It is considered a pivotal part of Ramadan all over the world.

== History ==
The idea of Imsakiah began in Egypt during the reign of the Ottoman Empire, and during the rule of Muhammad Ali of Egypt and two years before his death in the month of Ramadan 1262 AH / 1846 CE. It was first printed in the printing house in Boulaq, Egypt, and it was a yellow paper with 27 cm wide and 17.5 cm long.
