= Kentongan =

Indonesian-Javanese instrument

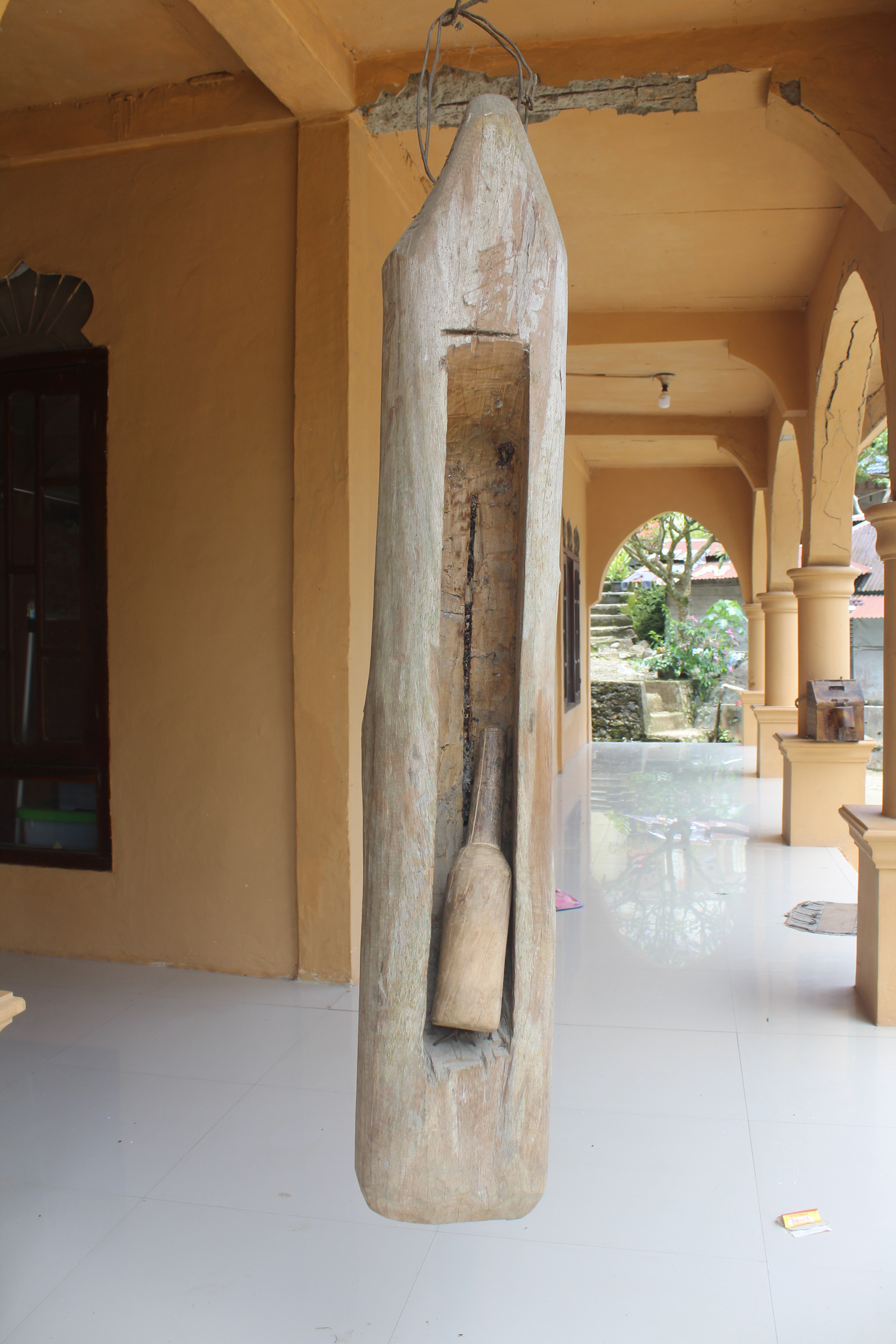
- A Kentongan as it appears

Percussion instrument
- Other names: Kentungan
- Classification: Idiophone
- Hornbostel–Sachs classification: 111.24 (Percussion vessels)
- Volume: high
- Decay: medium

Related instruments
- Drum

Musicians
- Ketoprak; Jatilan

A kentongan (Javanese: ꦏꦼꦤ꧀ꦠꦺꦴꦔꦤ꧀ pronounced [kəntoŋan]), or kentungan, is a 13th-century traditional Javanese type of slit drum that is classified as a percussion instrument and an idiophone. A hollow wooden bell, the kentongan is used primarily as a tool for communication, community security, and marking prayer times including Ramadan activities like sahur. In terms of communication, it is often used for disaster risk and warning of an incoming disaster often installed in rural and other communal spaces.

The instrument is commonly associated with the AI-generated meme Tung Tung Tung Sahur.

== Description ==
The kentongan, or kentungan, is a hollowed-out cylinder made from various kinds of bamboo (Dendrocalamus asper, Gigantochloa apus, Gigantochloa atroviolacea); wood (e.g. jackfruit, teak, coconut, mahogany, sengon); or bronze, depending on the region. It has a long vertical slit that acts as a resonance chamber. It is struck in a doro muluk pattern with a wooden mallet or beater to produce a deep, loud, and penetrating clicking or popping sound.

While many are plain bamboo tubes, some versions are carved into intricate shapes resembling humans, fish, or mythical creatures like dragons (nāga) and the garuda. After being struck with a mallet, it makes an echoing "tung-tung" or "thok-thok" sound that decays over a short noticeable period of time.

Different rhythms, tempos, and repetitions by a kentongan could signal different meanings: A slow rhythm could indicate safe conditions during ronda; while a fast and continuous rhythm, often called gobyok or titir, could signal danger such as fires, flood, theft, landslides, or encounters with wild animals. Playing this instrument also calls people to meetings, gotong royong, kenduri, posyandu, and other local gatherings.

== History ==
No firm historical record has been found for the exact development of this instrument let alone the beginning of its use. Historian Sarkawi B. Husain of Airlangga University, suggests that the practice may have developed after the arrival of Islam in Indonesia, rather than a directly imported Middle Eastern custom. There are regional differences, such as ngarak beduk or beduk sahur in Jakarta and bagarakan sahur in among the Banjar in South Kalimantan, where people use simple objects such as pans, water gallons, radios, and other sound-making tools in place of a kentongan.

In Javanese Muslim communities, they are often placed in mosque or prayer-house verandas beside the bedug, with both instruments used in religious timekeeping, including the marking of prayer times and the breaking of the fast during Ramadan. In some communities, it is also used as a marker of social status based on wood type, size, and placement. Though in many places in the advent of modernization and technological advancement, the kentongan has seen a gradual replacement or supplemented by the bedug, mosque loudspeakers, portable speakers, drums, jerrycans, electric instruments, and vehicle-mounted sound systems.

The earliest record of the kentongan dates back to the 13th century during the Eastern Javanese period.

== Use ==
In Javanese villages, the kentongan is often used as a tool for communication, mainly serving as an early warning system that can be heard across the village warning of incoming or sudden emergencies; it is also used as an educational tool.

In other uses it's also used as a sign to tell others that residents were on duty patrolling the village, which often comforts other residents within the village, giving them a sense of security. The kentongan is also used to wake people up to eat sahur, although a bedug can be used too.

The kentongan is historically used by ketoprak musicians and jatilan performers.

== As an internet meme ==
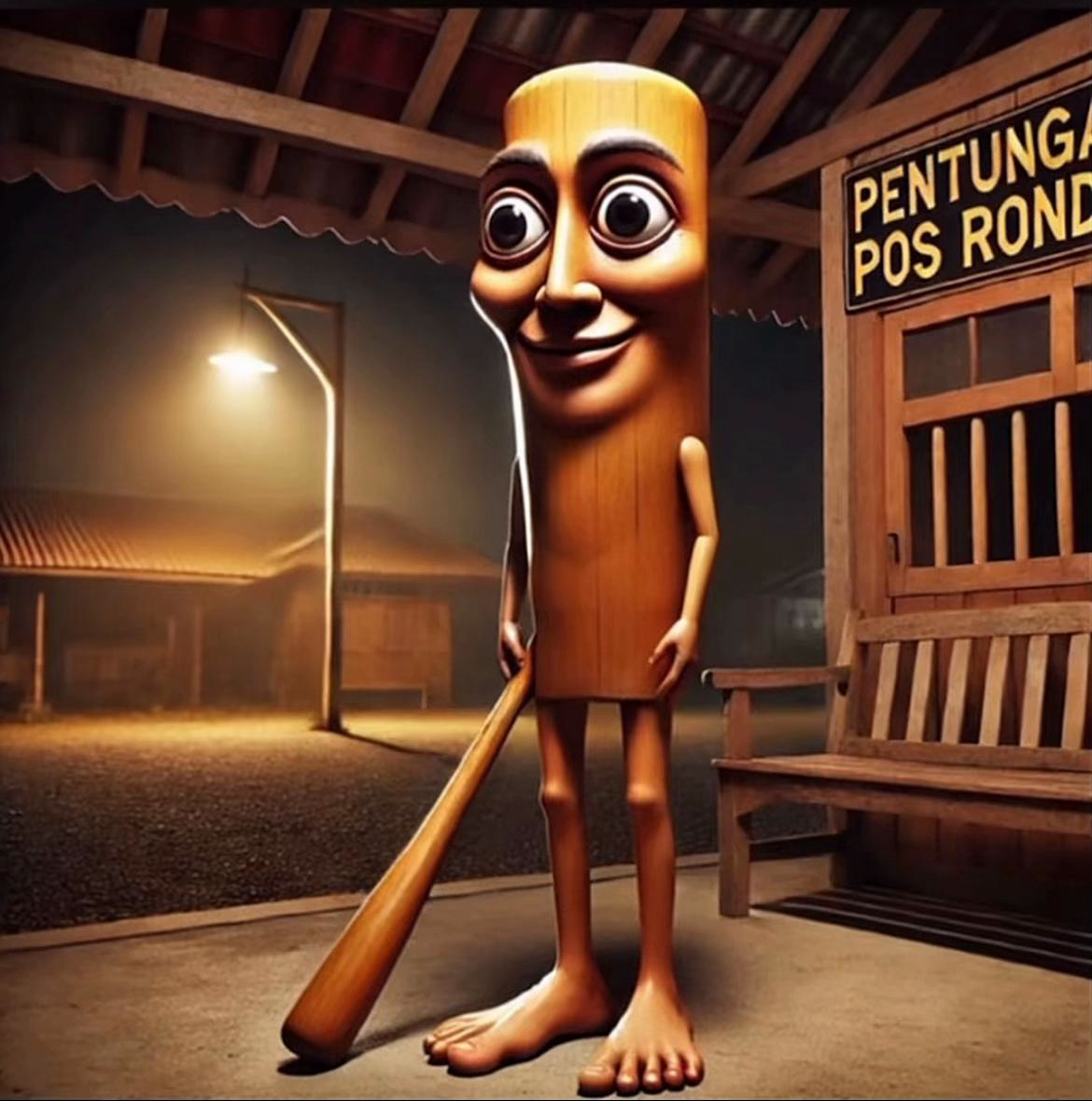
Tung Tung Tung Sahur, the AI-generated internet meme based on the kentongan

The kentongan has gained internet popularity through "Tung Tung Tung Sahur", an AI-generated anthropomorphic kentongan character associated with the "Italian brainrot" meme collective. The character is depicted carrying a wooden drumstick or a baseball bat. Despite the "Italian brainrot" largely subsiding in popularity, the character has remained popular via absurdist shitposting, ironic memes, and its appearance in video games such as Fortnite and Steal a Brainrot.
