= An Alt Girl for Skoof =

- Developers: Terletski Games, Rik Animation
- Publisher: Terletski Games
- Platforms: Windows, macOS, Linux, Android, iOS
- Release: April 21, 2024
- Genre: Casual game

An Alt Girl for Skoof is a visual novel-style computer game developed and published by the Russian development teams Terletski Games and Rik Animation. The game was released on Steam on April 21, 2024, and subsequently on VK Play two days later. It is available for Windows, macOS, SteamOS, and Linux. The game's premise is based on internet memes about alt girls and skoofs, internet slang terms originating in Russian-language online culture. In the story, a middle-aged man signs up on a fictional government platform to receive a personal alt girl. Players choose from three characters and navigate a branching dialogue system leading to five possible endings. The game was created in approximately one month, with the script written by comic book author Vitaly Terletsky and visual style handled by artist Rikani. At launch, the game achieved an 85% positive rating on Steam and entered the top 5 best-selling games on the Russian Steam store within one day of release. Critical reception was mixed, with some reviewers criticizing the narrative and humor quality while others argued its intentionally low-effort style was consistent with the creators' goals. Since its release, the game has received several expansions.

== Gameplay ==
The game is based on internet memes about alt girls and skoofs. Alt girls are members of the alt subculture. This subculture got its name in 2020, when users of the social media platform TikTok decided that all content on the platform could be divided into "straight" (mainstream content) and "alt" (a counterculture of people who oppose popular trends). The term alt can also be viewed as an umbrella term for several subcultures such as goths, emos, dead inside, and others. Skoofs are middle-aged men who neglect their personal appearance—that is, men who are overweight, have receding hairlines, unkempt stubble, wear unflattering clothes, and look older than their actual age.

The word skuf derives from the surname of Alexey Skufin, a frequent user of the Dvach imageboard, and later spread beyond Dvach, giving rise to numerous memes.

In November 2023, a meme began circulating online claiming that by filling out an application on the Russian government portal Gosuslugi, one could receive a personal alt girl from the state; the meme did not go viral until January 2024. The game is based on this meme, which the creators describe as "an immersive simulator that fully immerses players in the life of a middle-aged man". In the story, a 40-year-old skuf signs up on the online platform Skoofuslugi to get his own personal alt girl. The player can choose from three girls: Ksyusha, Nastya, and Alisa. After selecting a girl, the player must fill out a form that requires, among other things, information about the condition of their teeth and the size of their penis. If the player decides to lie about even one of these items, there will be consequences; for example, the game might simply shut down at any moment. The game features a complex branching system of choices which, according to the developers, has almost no impact on anything nevertheless, the player can reach five different endings.

== Development and release ==
The game was created by the Russian development teams Terletski Games and Rik Animation. Comic book author Vitaly Terletsky was responsible for the script, while artist Rikani—known for her viral anime-style music videos—handled the visual style and voice acting for the characters Ksyusha, Nastya, and Alisa; For example, Rikani and her studio have created music videos for songs by artists such as Slava Marlow. According to Terletsky, he was inspired to create An Alt Girl for Skoof by visual novel developers Nikita Kryukov (Milk Inside a Bag of Milk Inside a Bag of Milk) and Saikono Joker (Tiny Bunny). Additionally, according to Rikani, Vitaly decided to make the game the day after the artist started actively sending him memes about skoofs and alt girls. Because visual novels are very simple to produce, the game was created in just one month; of that time, Terletsky spent six days developing the plot. The soundtrack was composed by Nikita Kryukov, the main character — the skuf — was voiced by Kirill Kutuzov, and his inner voice was provided by Russian musician Prophet Sanboy. According to Terletsky, the developers did not set out to create a commercial project; for them, "it was a challenge—to try something new that seemed impossible." An Alt Girl for Skoof was released on April 21, 2024, on the Steam digital distribution platform and two days later on VK Play. The game was originally scheduled for release on April 15.

== Reception ==
At launch, the game had an 85% positive rating on Steam. Just one day after its release, it entered the top 5 best-selling games on the Russian Steam store, with a peak concurrent player count of 1,364. At the same time, journalists' reviews of the game were mixed. For example, Anastasia Vismut, in a review for the website Cybersport.ru, criticized the game for its drawn-out narrative, underdeveloped plot, and lack of quality humor; at the same time, she noted as a plus the presence of Prophet Sanboy, who "didn't even try to make an effort, but respect for being there." At the same time, Sergey Sergienko, who left a review for the same website, took a less critical view of the game, largely addressing the concerns raised by the author of the previous review. He did not deny that the quality of the project left much to be desired, but in his words, "it is very important to understand that this is exactly what the creators were aiming for: there is no claim to masterpiece status here, nor any attempt to create something that aspires to a place in history".
