= Sovietwave =

Subgenre of synthwave

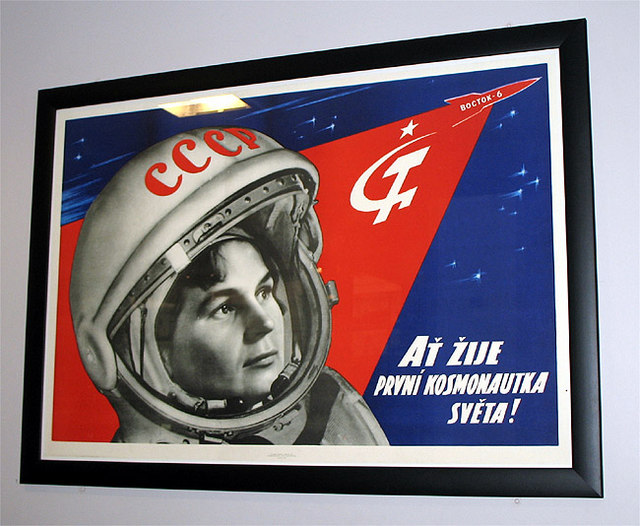
- Valentina Tereshkova, the first woman in space, with text in Czech language. Common motifs of Sovietwave are retrofuturism, technological utopianism, and musical elements evocative of the Space Age.
- Stylistic origins: Synthwave; space age pop; synth-pop; 1980s film soundtracks; post-punk
- Cultural origins: Early 2010s, post-Soviet states (particularly Russia, Belarus and Ukraine)
- Typical instruments: Digital audio workstation

Other topics
- Vaporwave; chillwave; fashwave

Sovietwave (also styled Soviet wave or Soviet-wave) is a subgenre of synthwave music and accompanying Internet aesthetic which originates from the former Soviet Union, primarily Russia. It is characterized by an emphasis on the technology and culture of the Soviet Union, such as the Soviet space program and retrofuturistic Soviet era architecture and art, and is an expression of nostalgia for the Soviet Union. Linguist Maria Engström described Sovietwave as the post-Soviet counterpart to vaporwave, evoking a similar nostalgic critique of the "contemporary collapse of futurity" and longing for the lost optimism of a bygone era.

== History ==
At the height of the trance music boom in the 2000s, Russian trance duo PPK used the melodies of Soviet electronic music as the basis of their compositions, pioneering the fusion of contemporary electronic music with Soviet-era nostalgia.

Until 2014, the groups of the "Soviet wave" — N.E.M.O., Kim and Buran, PPVK — were often classified as indie, lo-fi or other type of electronics. One of the first performers who took a course to isolate themselves from the rest of electronic music was the Kharkiv project "Mayak".

The main inspirations for Sovietwave artists are typically the collective cultural memories associated with the Soviet era. Lyudmila Shevchenko of Jan Kochanowski University considers the genre a manifestation of romanticized "nostalgic myth". Sovietwave became popular in post-Soviet countries in the latter half of the 2010s, drawing on synthwave and nostalgia for mid-century Soviet culture in the region.

In September 2017, on Moscow City Day sovietwave compositions were used in the musical design of the Crafts Park pavilion. In August 2018, the first music festival "Volna-1" ("Wave-1") dedicated to the genre was held in St. Petersburg; "Volna-2" was held on August 10, 2019, in Moscow. On July 22, 2019, an Olympic Night concert party was held in the abandoned SKA pool in Novosibirsk, decorated in the style of Soviet nostalgia; most of the collectives belonged to local sovietwave groups.

During the COVID-19 pandemic, Sovietwave experienced a growth in popularity, along with related forms of vaporwave and synthwave. This upsurge was driven in large part by the success of the Belarusian post-punk band Molchat Doma, whose song "Судно (Борис Рыжий)" from the album Etazhi became a popular meme on TikTok. According to Cat Zhang of Pitchfork, the song connected with Generation Z's "deep pessimism towards the future". Molchat Doma's entry into the mainstream spawned multiple compilations of the genre on streaming platforms such as Spotify and YouTube, which feature more overt nostalgia for Soviet and Space Age aesthetics despite the band's criticism of the genre for "fail[ing] to recognize the harsh realities of life in the region".

Sovietwave gained popularity primarily with younger Millennials and Generation Z in post-Soviet states. Hungarian lifestyle writer Zsófia Tóth noted that Sovietwave "playlists are usually listened to by young people who were born just before the fall of the Soviet Union or have only experienced its aftermath." Tóth theorized that younger audiences were drawn to Sovietwave not out of nostalgia for an era they could remember, but as a form of escapism which reflected their disillusionment with current social and economic conditions in their home countries.

Music historian Stephen Gamble described the growing popularity of Sovietwave as part of a larger trend which encompassed the rise of the lo-fi genre in the late 2000s. Gamble notes that Sovietwave was brought to an international audience by "the wide accessibility of YouTube music mixes."

== Characteristics ==
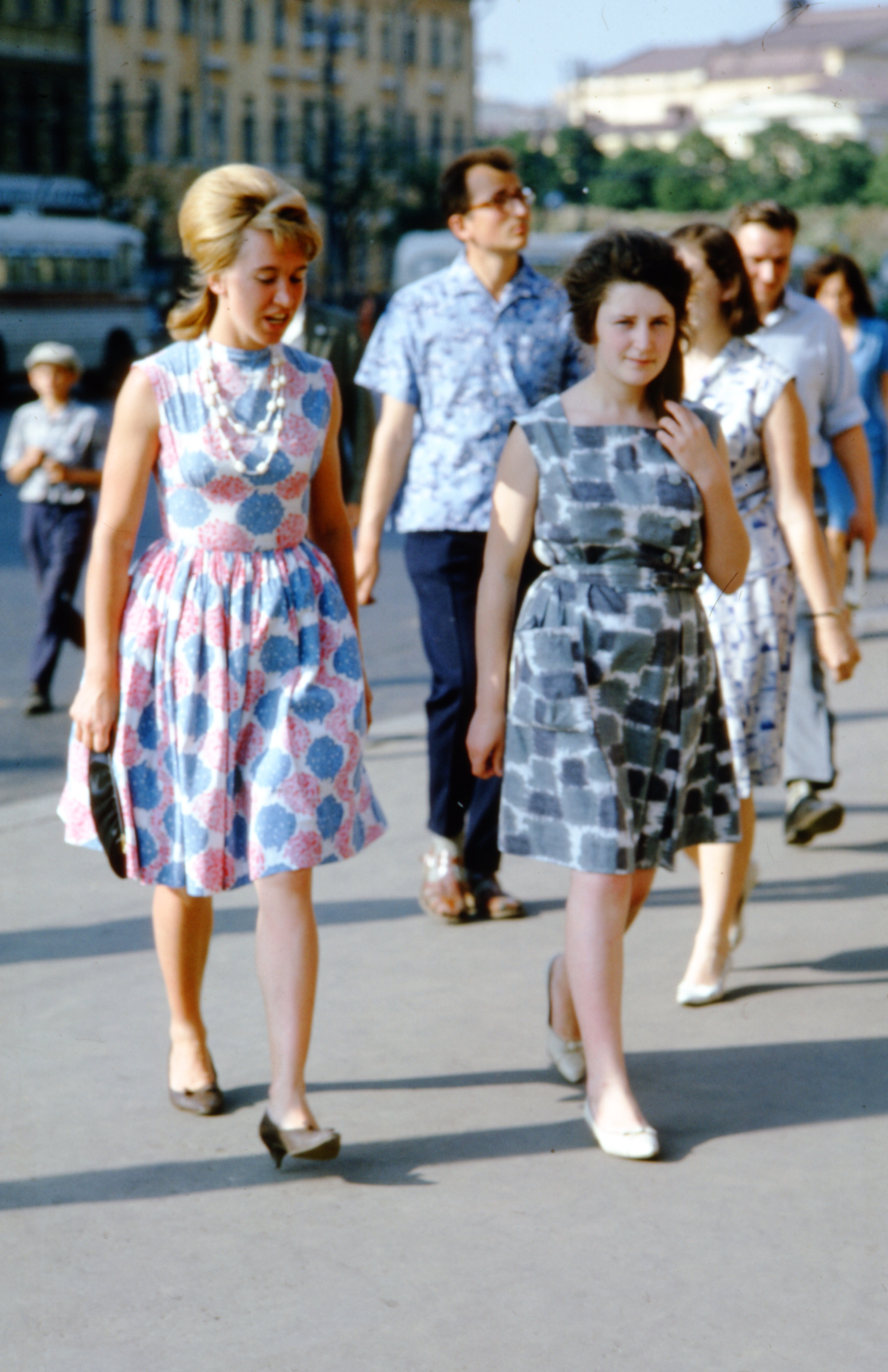
Sovietwave music is characterized by an emphasis on cultural and scientific aspects of Soviet life.

Sovietwave is based on modern electronic music trends such as lo-fi and ambient music, as well as the new wave and synth-pop of the late Soviet Union. Despite Sovietwave's widespread use of sampling from radio programs and speeches, the genre is not overtly political. Sovietwave music is characterized by an emphasis on the cultural, political and scientific aspects of Soviet life, with excerpts from educational films and speeches by Soviet statesmen being used primarily to create a nostalgic experience for the listener. Sovietwave usually draws on images of space and technological progress which disappeared with the collapse of the Soviet space program, together with positive childhood reminiscences and technological utopianism of the Space Age; social scientist Natalija Majsova described this trend as "nostalgia for the past future".

The genre is influenced by the music of old Soviet animation and film, such as The Mystery of the Third Planet, Guest from the Future, The Adventures of the Elektronic, Courier, Leopold the Cat, Moscow-Cassiopeia, Office Romance, One Hundred Days After Childhood, Three from Prostokvashino, and Yeralash. Common musical influences on the genre include Soviet composers Vyacheslav Mescherin, Eduard Artemyev and Aleksandr Zatsepin, and the bands Zodiac, Alliance, Forum, Mayak, and New Collection. The genre is also influenced by the work of Western musicians that were popular in the USSR, such as Depeche Mode, Digital Emotion, and Modern Talking.

Russian researcher Ivan Beletsky described Sovietwave as being similar to the earlier microgenre chillwave, noting that both evoke the popular music and aesthetics of the 1980s, and often utilize low frequency beats and vintage synthesizers. Beletsky described Sovietwave aesthetics as evoking "the bright side of the Soviet state of the 1960s-80s", playing on the childhood memories of those who lived through that era, as well as the general sense of optimism associated with the Space Age.

Stephen Gamble described Sovietwave as a mixture of older Soviet music "with the electronic sounds of synthwave."

== See also ==
- Hardvapour
- Hauntology
- Nostalgia for the Soviet Union
- Socialist realism
- Soviet brainrot
- Soyuzmultfilm
- Space age pop
- Synth-pop
- Technological utopianism
