= Brain rot =

Slang for poor-quality digital content

Excessive scrolling through low-quality short-form internet content may impair a person's ability to focus on other aspects of their life

In Internet culture, the term brain rot (often written as brainrot) describes digital media deemed to be of low quality or value. More broadly, the term refers to the harmful cognitive effects associated with excessive or disordered use of digital and social media, particularly short-form content, AI slop, and doomscrolling. Popularized by Generation Z and Alpha on social media, the term has since entered mainstream usage. It was the Oxford English Dictionary's 2024 "Word of the Year".

== Origin and usage ==
According to Oxford University Press, the first recorded use of the term brain rot traces back to the 1854 book Walden by Henry David Thoreau. In that book, Thoreau reflected on materialism and argued that a tendency to prefer trivial ideas could weaken the mind, a harbinger for how the term would come to be used to describe the effects of disordered use of digital content. He asked:

While England endeavors to cure the potato-rot, will not any endeavor to cure the brain-rot, which prevails so much more widely and fatally?

Thoreau was criticizing what he saw as a decline in intellectual standards, comparing it to the effects of potato blight in 1840s Europe, which had caused widespread crop failures.

In 2007, brain rot was used by Twitter users to describe dating game shows, video games, and "hanging out online". Usage of the phrase increased online in the 2010s before spiking in popularity in 2020 on Discord, when it became an Internet meme. From 2023 to 2024, Oxford reported the term's usage increased by 230% in frequency per million words.

As of 2024, it was used in the context of Generation Alpha's digital habits, with critics noting that the generation is "excessively immersed in online culture", underscoring the fact that by 2024, an estimated 79 percent of the world's population of 15–24 year olds used the internet. The term brain rot has been associated with the tendency for young people to pepper their speech with Internet references such as skibidi (referencing Skibidi Toilet), rizz (charisma), gyatt (buttocks), fanum tax (taking food from another's meal), and sigma (solitary, masculine men).

== Analysis ==
In an article for Literary Hub, Josh Abbey argued that the concept of brain rot had existed long before the phrase was coined, likening it to William Wordsworth's criticism of "frantic novels" in 1800 and the criticisms of film and television by Virginia Woolf and Aldous Huxley in the 20th century. Günseli Yalcinkaya compared brain rot to 20th century artistic and political movements such as Dada for being "intentionally absurd, context-less and fast-paced", and noted how it can be used to push political messages.

Alexander Serenko has attributed popularization of brain rot content to supply and demand factors. On the supply side, Serenko associates brain rot both with the business models of the major social media platforms that rely on maintaining user attention, and the desire on the part of creators to monetize low-quality material for profit, increasingly with reliance on generative AI (see AI slop). On the demand side, he links consumption of such material to users' psychological preference for low-effort, repetitive, rewarding activities. He sees typical features of brain rot content as being associated with emotional intensity, brevity, familiar characters, and references to cultural or societal themes, and ease of understanding.

=== Mental health responses ===
Educational psychologists began utilizing the phrase brain rot in reviews of research into the relationships between cognitive decline, mental exhaustion, and excessive exposure to low-quality social media materials, arguing that research has demonstrated that brain rot leads to "emotional desensitization, cognitive overload, and a negative self-concept". By 2024, mental health organizations had begun to use the term, offering suggestions for prevention and treatment. The Newport Institute, an organization dedicated to providing resources for young adults, suggested the following prevention techniques: "try limiting screen time, deleting distracting apps from your phone, and turning off unnecessary notifications". Others have suggested resilience training, AI literacy, and regular mental health assessments. Those in higher education have also sought to promote responses to brain rot. Professor Dr. Sri Lestari from Universitas Muhammadiyah Surakarta observed that although brain rot has not been classified as an official psychological disorder, she recommended instilling self-control at a young age and reducing screen time.

== Influence ==
The term brain rot was named Oxford Word of the Year in 2024, beating other words like demure and romantasy. Its modern usage is defined by the Oxford University Press as "the supposed deterioration of a person's mental or intellectual state, especially viewed as the result of overconsumption of material (now particularly online content) considered to be trivial or unchallenging". Offering an explanation for the term, The Guardian journalist Siân Boyle provided commentary on the "brain rot" scholarship that purportedly identified links between excessive screen use and reduced memory capacity and reduced attention. In the Spanish language periodical El País, Uruguayan journalist Facundo Macchi then similarly reviewed scholarship on the effects of excessive amounts of low-quality online materials, utilizing the disputed phrase "social media addiction" (rather than the scientifically accurate phrase problematic social media use) to argue that the scholarship supported a link between so-called "junk content" and both shortened attention spans and weakened memory.

In the same year, millennial Australian senator Fatima Payman made headlines by making a short speech to the Australian parliament using Generation Alpha slang. She introduced the speech as addressing "an oft-forgotten section of our society", referring to Generations Z and Alpha, and said that she would "render the remainder of my statement using language they're familiar with". Using slang terms, Payman criticised the government's plans to ban under-16s from social media and closed by saying that, "Though some of you cannot yet vote, I hope that, when you do, it will be in a more goated Australia for a government with more aura. Skibidi!" The speech, written by a 21-year-old staff member, was labeled by some as an example of "brain rot" outside the online world.

In the 2025 Jubilee of the World of Communications, brain rot was also used by Pope Francis, the head of the Catholic Church, as he urged people to reduce their use of social media and avoid "putrefazione cerebrale".

Taking a different approach, one researcher who interviewed Norwegian 16- and 17-year-olds about the term has argued that brain rot is best understood as a way that young people participate in social media, utilizing deliberately non-productive messaging as a means of resisting the pressures of productivity and self-optimization.

== See also ==
- Algospeak – Obfuscated speech on social media
- Digital media use and mental health – Mental health effects of using digital media
- Elsagate – Controversy concerning a genre of YouTube videos
- Enshittification – Decline in online platform quality
- Glossary of 2020s slang
- Low culture – Forms of popular culture with mass appeal
- Shitposting – Intentionally posting poor-quality social media posts
- Sludge content – Genre of split-screen video
- Soviet brainrot – Russian AI-generated Internet memes
- TikTokification – Videos using TikTok's mobile format
- Italian brainrot – 2025 AI-generated Internet memes
