= Petrovich =

Petrovich is a patronymic surname derived from the Slavic-style patronymic derived from a Slavic form of the given name Peter. It addition, it may be an English-language phonemic rendering of the surnames Petrović and Petrovič. Notable people and fictional characters with the given surname include:

- Curt Petrovich, Canadian journalist
- Dmitri Petrovich, fictional character from the Backyard Sports franchise
- Donna Petrovich, Australian politician
- Iván Petrovich, Serbian film actor and singer
- Jon Petrovich, American journalist and television executive
