= Grow a Garden =

2025 video game

- One of the game's thumbnails, c. August 2025
- Developers: BMWLux; Jandel; Jhailatte
- Publishers: Splitting Point Studios; DoBig Studios
- Engine: Roblox Studio
- Platform: Various: Windows macOS Android HarmonyOS iOS iPadOS PlayStation 4 PlayStation 5 Xbox One Xbox Series X/S
- Release: March 26, 2025
- Genre: Idle
- Mode: Multiplayer

Grow a Garden (colloquially abbreviated as GAG) is a free-to-play multiplayer idle video game released on Roblox on March 26, 2025. In it, players tend to their garden by buying seeds and harvesting crops for money. The game is known for achieving exceptionally high concurrent user counts (CCU), peaking at 22.3 million players online on August 23, 2025. Previous CCU peaks include over 16 million on June 21, the highest ever recorded in video game history (surpassing Fortnite's 15.3 million), and over 5 million on May 18, beating the previous record for a Roblox game. The game is co-owned by its original developer BMWLux and Splitting Point Studios, a development team led by Jandel, with DoBig Studios holding a minority share.

== Gameplay ==
A player on their plot with starter crops. Late-game crops are visible in the background.

Grow a Garden is a farming-themed idle game. The player begins with an empty plot of farmland among other players' plots and in-game currency called Sheckles (¢) to buy carrot seeds. By planting and harvesting crops, which continue to grow even while the player is offline, they can earn more Sheckles to buy more progressively exotic plant seeds. The seeds may go in and out of stock, and exclusive items are released weekly that players must be online to claim, helping to boost player retention.

Players can obtain pets by opening loot boxes. Roblox's built-in premium currency, Robux, can be used to speed up waiting, gain additional perks, and steal others' crops. The game's aesthetics feature studded textures evocative of old-school Roblox games. Its soundtrack is composed of classical music, such as Wolfgang Amadeus Mozart's Rondo Alla Turca.

== Development ==
The game was created by an anonymous 16-year-old who goes by the username "BMWLux". Jandel's Splitting Point Studios bought a share of the game in April 2025, when it had around 1,000 concurrent users (CCUs). According to Jandel, the original developer owns 50% of the game, and the initial version was developed in only three days. Sometime later, Florida-based Roblox game development company Do Big Studios came to hold a minority share. The studio has been criticized for introducing excessive monetization to the game. Jandel has declined to share revenue figures.

On May 18, the game released its "Blood Moon" update; with about five million peak concurrent users (CCU), Grow a Garden nearly doubled the previous Roblox CCU record set by Blox Fruits. Upon the release of the "Bizzy Bees" update on May 31, the game reached a peak of over 11.7 million CCU. On June 14, the game released its "Working Bees" update, leading to another record CCU of over 16 million. This figure, if accurate, would surpass the then-highest CCU recorded in video game history—Fortnite's 15.3 million CCU in December 2020—as well as CCUs of the most popular games on Steam, such as PUBG: Battlegrounds and Counter Strike 2. On June 21, the "Summer Update" was released, bringing new seeds, cosmetics, and events, and had a peak of 21.3 million CCU. PocketGamer.Biz noted that "Grow a Garden doesn't typically sustain its peaks for long" and that the game's CCU fell to 7.6 million within an hour.

To keep up with weekly events, the game created two teams dedicated to event development in July. For the game's July 26 "Corruption Update", Jandel hosted an event featuring NFL football player Travis Kelce. On August 23, Jandel and the creator of Steal a Brainrot, another popular Roblox game, battled each other in a mock "admin war", leading both games to break their own CCU records: Grow a Garden had at least 22.3 million CCU, while Steal a Brainrot became the second Roblox game to surpass 20 million CCU. The game has since lost its CCU record to Steal a Brainrot in September 2025.

== Popularity ==
As of May 2026, the game has received over 35.3 billion visits and around 10.9 million favourites. It is the fastest Roblox game to have reached a billion visits, doing so in 33 days. Jandel has stated that around 35% of the player base is under 13 years old. An unofficial replica of the game can be found as a Fortnite Creative map. Finance publications such as Investor's Business Daily, Barron's, and The Motley Fool have partly attributed the recent rise in Roblox stock prices—including a 21% growth in June—to the sudden surge in popularity of Grow a Garden. The popularity of the game helped Roblox achieve an average of 111.8 million daily active users in Q2 2025, a growth of 41 percent year-over-year. In its Q2 2025 financial report, the platform adjusted its projected 2025 bookings (customer spending) from $5.29–5.36 billion to $5.87–5.97 billion, giving its stock price another boost of 16%. By July 19, Grow a Garden was #1 on Roblox's "Top Earners" chart.

The game averaged 2.7 million CCU on June 25. There have been concerns that some of Grow a Garden's player count consists of automated bot accounts. Roblox has disagreed with this idea, stating, "our preliminary analysis confirms genuine popularity, not artificial inflation, validating the game's authentic community-driven growth." Upon the game reaching 5 million CCU, investment company TD Cowen alleged that fraudulent bot activities artificially inflated Grow a Garden's visibility in Roblox's game recommendation algorithm, pointing to an upsurge in account creation rates in the Philippines and Indonesia. However, it later retracted its claims of manipulation, while still noting the upsurge. Some in-game items are only available for a short period of time during updates, which may incentivize people to use bots for collecting them. Many players offer to exchange rare items for real-life money through unofficial avenues, such as eBay or Discord, but such practice is a violation of Roblox's terms of service.

== Reception ==
Nicole Carpenter, writing for Game File, called the game the "new generation's FarmVille", and noted the game's simplicity. Zack Zwiezen of Kotaku commented that the game appears more like a prototype rather than a finished game. Ted Litchfield of PC Gamer noted that as an outsider, "there is a cognitive dissonance to learning that it's far more popular than any game I've ever covered or played". PCGamesN listed it among the best Roblox games of 2025 but commented it was "a pretty standard AFK game" despite apparently being "hard to put down for millions of Roblox players". Kieran Press-Reynolds, writing for The New York Times, observed that despite the game's success, most coverage has been limited to short-form videos, with little long-form content available.

== Film adaptation ==
In November 2025, a film adaptation of the game was announced to be in development at Story Kitchen in collaboration with the developers, with Dmitri M. Johnson, Michael Lawrence Goldberg, and Timothy I. Stevenson set to produce.

== See also ==
- List of Roblox games
