= Tung Tung Tung Sahur =

AI-generated character

- Italian brainrot character
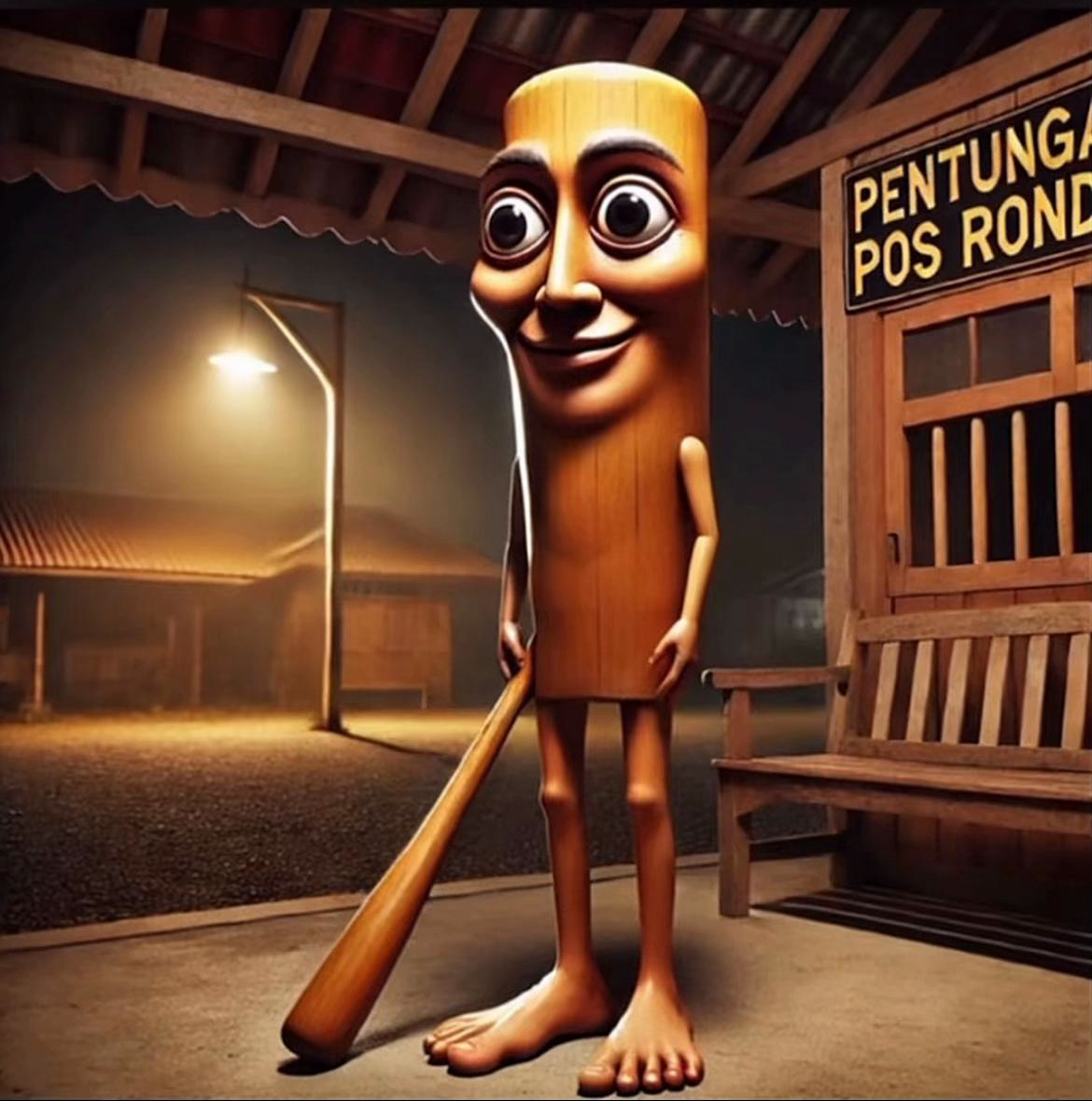
- The original AI-generated image of Tung Tung Tung Sahur
- First appearance: February 28, 2025; 20 months ago
- Created by: Fernanda Bagas Indrastata
- Based on: Kentongan; sahur
- Designed by: DALL-E
- Medium: AI art

In-universe information
- Full name: Tung Tung Tung Tung Tung Tung Tung Tung Tung Sahur
- Nicknames: Tung Tung Sahur; T³; TTT Sahur; Tung; Tung Tung; Triple T; TTT
- Species: Anthropomorphic kentongan
- Gender: Male
- Affiliation: Other characters within the Italian brainrot series

Tung Tung Tung Sahur (/ˈtuːŋ ˌsaˈhur/ TOONG sa-HOOR) (Note: Often shortened to Triple T, Tung Tung, TTT Sahur, T^{3} (pronounced T-cubed or T to the 3), or simply Tung) is an AI-generated fictional character created in 2025 using DALL-E by the Indonesian TikTok user Fernanda Bagas Indrastata, also known as "Noxa" online. Although culturally Indonesian, the character gained initial popularity as a part of a genre broadly termed "Italian brainrot", a colloquial designation for a style of absurdist AI-generated internet characters popular among Generation Alpha and to some extent Generation Z.

The character is an anthropomorphic kentongan (a traditional Indonesian slit drum) of the type used during the Islamic month of Ramadan as a wake-up call for the pre-dawn meal of sahur. He is depicted carrying a wooden drumstick, or a baseball bat. Despite the popularity of Italian brainrot largely subsiding, the character has remained popular via absurdist shitposting, ironic memes, and its appearance in video games such as Fortnite, as well as the Roblox game Steal a Brainrot.

In 2026, Noxa's French-based licensing agency, Mementum Lab, filed a claim that they owned the rights to the character, and sought to control the character's commercial rights and to license the use of his likeness. However, since he originates from an AI-generated image, Tung Tung Tung Sahur is currently ineligible for copyright protection, making him a public domain character. As legal proceedings continue, online debates have sparked on whether or not AI-generated characters should maintain copyright or not.

== History ==
Original video of Tung Tung Tung Sahur (music muted due to copyright)

On February 28, 2025, a day before Ramadan in Indonesia began, Indonesian TikTok creator Noxa asked DALL-E to "draw a pentungan sahur with a face and legs," following it up with additional prompts including "neighborhood watch post kentungan," "neighborhood watch post club," and "a patrol pentungan with a single human leg." He later uploaded the image he liked best on TikTok as part of the "Anomali AI character" trend, an Indonesian trend distinct from yet inspired by the Italian brainrot style of absurdist AI-generated beings with strange names, mock-lore, and repetitive audio. Anomali features anthropomorphic animals or objects with human features.

Radio Republik Indonesia attributes the popularity of Tung Tung Tung Sahur to absurd and surreal humor popular among Generation Z and Generation Alpha youth, where "the more absurd, the more entertaining". In an interview with Kompas, Muhammad Faisal of the Indonesian think tank Youth Laboratory Indonesia argued that the emergence of "anomaly" characters such as Tung Tung Tung Sahur comes from the media environment of Generation Alpha where children have grown up from birth with internet-connected smartphones and tablets. Unlike earlier generations, who often watched cartoons on television with family members present, Faisal argued that Generation Alpha usually encounters these characters through social media and online games without adult mediation or interaction. Early and constant exposure to the internet could explain why very young children, including kindergarten and early primary-school students, can quickly recognize and memorize absurdist internet characters.

Bahasa Indonesia (Original):

Tung, tung, tung, tung, tung, tung, tung, tung, tung, sahur.

Anomali mengerikan yang hanya keluar pada sahur, konon katanya kalau ada orang yang dipanggil sahur tiga kali dan tidak nyaut, maka makhluk ini datang di rumah kalian.

Hiii, seremnya! Tung Tung ini biasanya bersuara layaknya pukulan kentungan seperti ini, "tung, tung, tung, tung, tung, tung, tung". Share ke teman kalian yang susah sahur.

English translation:
Tung, tung, tung, tung, tung, tung, tung, tung, tung, sahur.

A terrifying anomaly that only appears at sahur. It is said that if someone is called for sahur three times and doesn't answer, then this creature will come to your house.

Eek, how scary! This Tung Tung usually makes a sound like a kentungan hitting something like this, "tung, tung, tung, tung, tung, tung, tung". Share this with your friends who have trouble eating during sahur.

— Transcript of the video

== Etymology and cultural origin ==
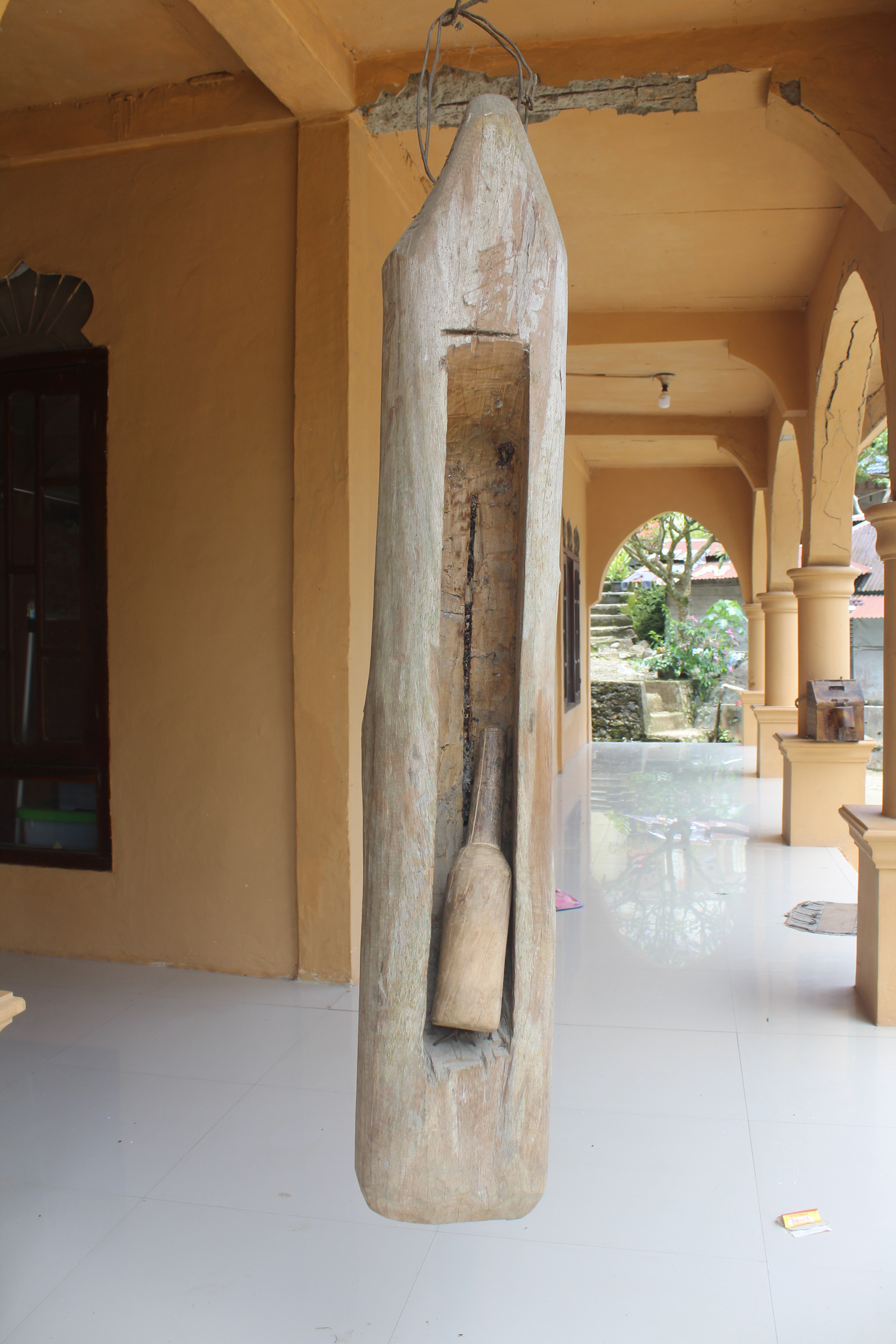
Tung Tung Tung Sahur is based on the Indonesian kentongan; the object often described as a "bat" is a pentungan. It is used to wake a village or to alert thieves.

Tung tung sahur is an informal phrase that may have emerged from traditional practices associated with sahur, the pre-dawn meal consumed by Muslims during the month of Ramadan. In various regions, particularly in Southeast Asia, communities have historically used rhythmic drumming, chanting, or other forms of noise-making as a wake-up call for residents. In Indonesia specifically, this practice is done by calling out and making percussive sounds with drums, kentongan, improvised containers, or other noisy objects. The expression tung tung serves as onomatopoeia, imitating the sound of percussive instruments used in these wake-up calls.

== Appearances ==
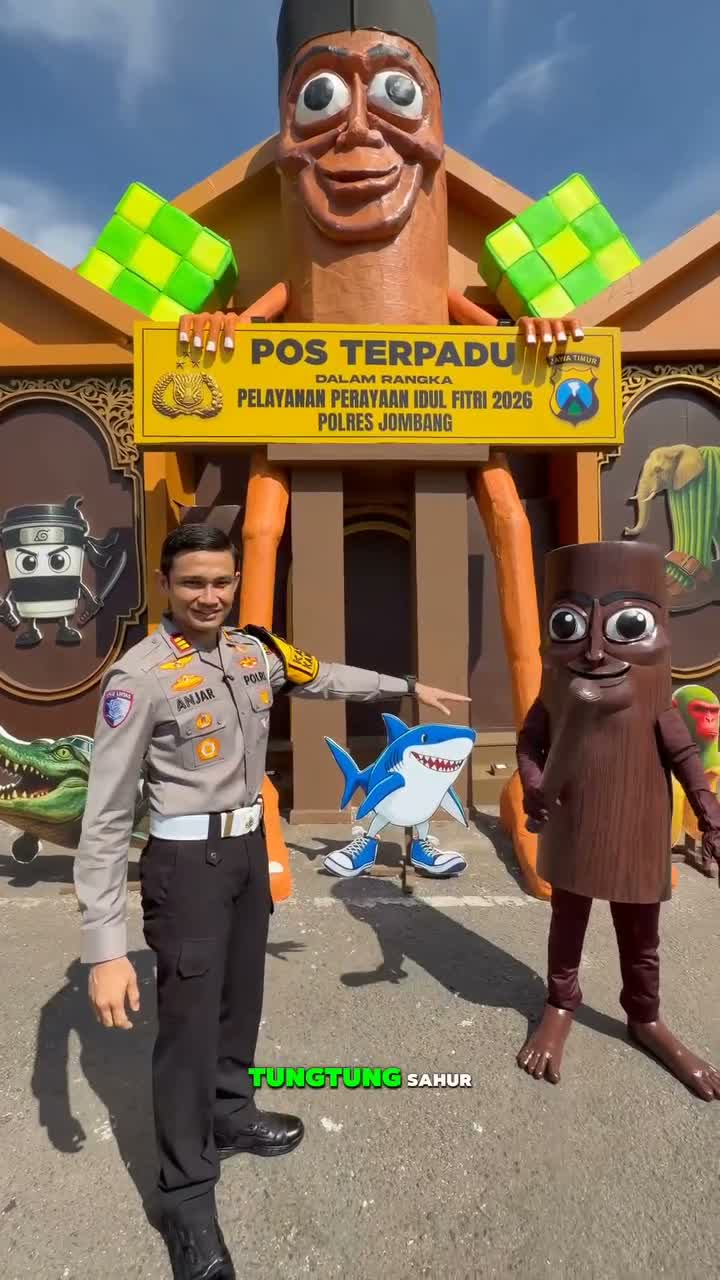
A Tung Tung Tung Sahur–themed police post in Jombang, East Java, used to encourage drivers with their families to rest during mudik

=== Steal a Brainrot ===
Tung Tung Tung Sahur was formerly featured in Steal a Brainrot, a multiplayer game distributed through the Roblox platform. It was removed in September 2025 after a copyright dispute, but was added back to the game in November 2025.

=== Fortnite ===
In 2026, a rumor circulated that Tung Tung Tung Sahur, alongside similar character Ballerina Cappuccina, would be included as a cosmetic purchase in the live service video game Fortnite. This was substantiated by a supposed leak claiming that the outfits would be released on April 1, 2026.

On March 18, 2026, Fortnite uploaded a trailer which confirmed the leaks by featuring both characters. The reception to their inclusion was largely negative, with fans voting them as being the worst cosmetic skins in the game. Some players claimed that they would specifically target those who use the cosmetics in-game. Many felt it was in poor taste to include an AI-generated character, which affected many artists working on Fortnite.

=== Film adaptation speculation ===
There has been speculation that a film about Tung Tung Tung Sahur is in talks for production. Indonesian film production company Dee Company (formerly K2K Pictures) was interested in making a film based on the character. The CEO of the company has met with Noxa, the creator of Tung Tung Tung Sahur. However, the company denied the rumors regarding the film's production.

== Copyright status ==
As it originates from an AI-generated image, Tung Tung Tung Sahur is ineligible for copyright protection, making him a public domain character. However in 2026, Noxa and his legal team Mementum Lab filed a legal claim stating they owned the copyright of the character. Once the character became one of the biggest attractions in Steal a Brainrot, the agency argued that the game was generating millions of dollars using a character they represent without permission. They claimed this was unfair to both the original creator, Noxa, and to other studios that paid for legitimate licenses. A later controversy involved a battle royale game Free Fire, where Noxa objected that a Tung Tung Tung Sahur-like character had been used without permission or credit, even while acknowledging the difficulty of copyrighting AI-generated work. He based the issue on ethical and moral rights problems.

Mementum Lab later published a legal filing outlining the prompts Noxa had entered into DALL-E to create his original image of Tung Tung Tung Sahur, and that the creative process behind the character was not limited to a single prompt, with Noxa going through "numerous iterations, experiments, selections, refinements, and creative decisions before arriving at the final result." They argued that this was enough evidence to say that Noxa used an "involved, artistic process" to create the character as well as his name, voice, and backstory, which they said was enough human authorship to maintain copyright.

Under Indonesia's Copyright Law No. 28 of 2014, copyright protection applies to works that are original and result from human creativity. Article 40 protects various artistic works, while Article 1 defines a protected creation as a work produced through human inspiration, skill, and ability in a tangible form. As AI-generated works produce content by processing existing data, references, and algorithms rather than exercising human creative judgment directly, its originality can be difficult to prove under Indonesian copyright law and remain legally contested.
