= Petrovič =

Petrovič is a Slovenian and Slovak surname. Notable people with this surname include:

- Alexander Petrovič, Slovak name of Sándor Petőfi, Hungarian poet of Slovak origin
- Alojz Petrovič (born 1936), Croatian gymnast
- Dejan Petrovič (born 1998), Slovenian football player
- Rok Petrovič, (1966–1993), Yugoslav and Slovenian alpine skier
- Tomaž Petrovič (born 1979), Slovenian football manager
