= Italian brainrot =

2025 AI-generated Internet memes

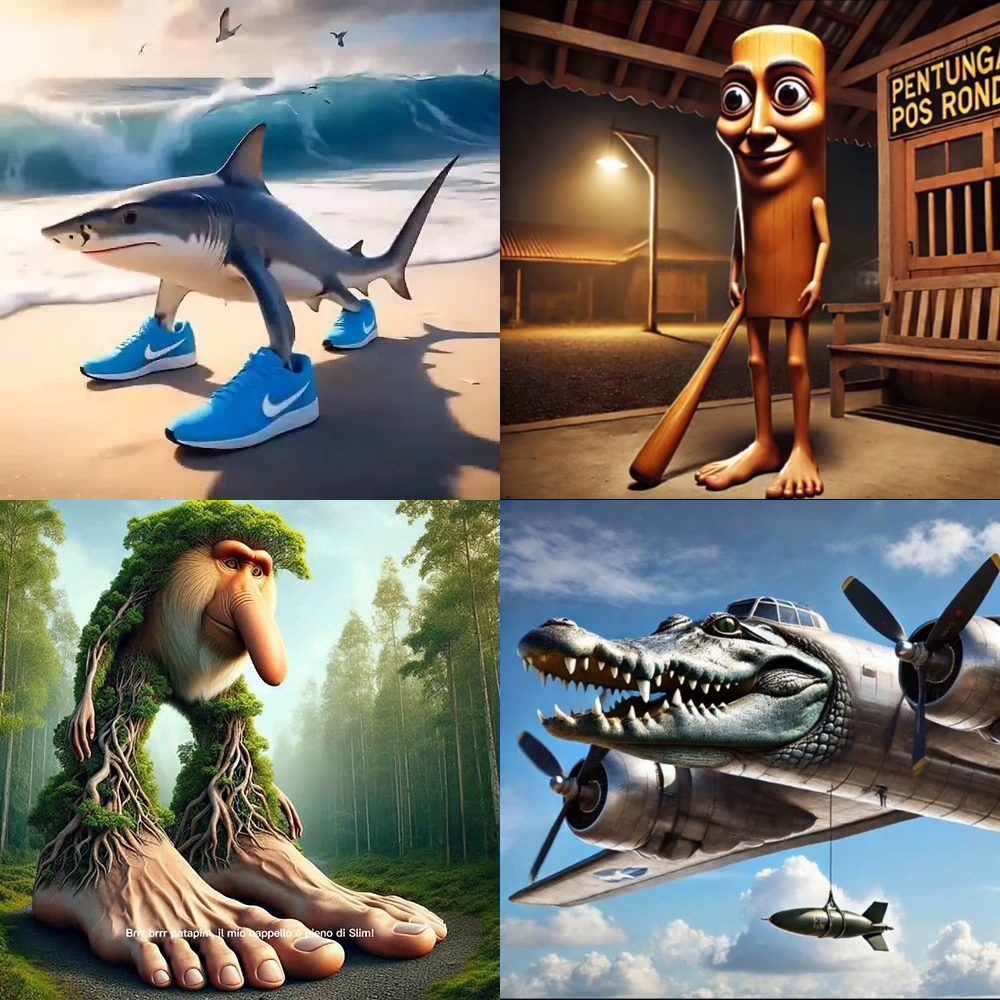
Characters from Italian brainrot, clockwise from top left: Tralalero Tralala, Tung Tung Tung Sahur, Bombardiro Crocodilo, Brr Brr Patapim

Italian brainrot is a series of internet memes that emerged in early 2025 characterized by AI-generated absurd and surrealist images of creatures who are mostly given Italian-inspired names. The phenomenon quickly spread across social media platforms such as TikTok and Instagram, going viral owing to a combination of sloppy aesthetics, synthesized Italian voiceovers, grotesque or humorous visuals, abstract nature, and nonsensical narrative.

== Origin ==
In October 2023, Internet users created various memes featuring American actor and wrestler Dwayne Johnson in which he is depicted as rhyming about absurd topics. In one video, he uses the nonsense phrase "Tralalero tralala", and later rhymes it with "smerdo pure nell'aldilà" ("I shit even in the afterlife"). The phrase was later used as the basis for Italian brainrot.

Although the exact origin of Italian brainrot is unclear, the character Tralalero Tralala is widely considered to be the first example of the trend. The creation of the character is often attributed to the TikTok user @eZburger401, who reportedly posted a video featuring the character in January 2025. The user was banned after posting, potentially due to its accompanying audio containing profanity. Later, another user @elchino1246 posted a video using Tralalero Tralala's audio, accompanied by an image of a shark mixed with a pigeon. On 13 January 2025, another user @amoamimandy.1a created a now-deleted post using the audio, featuring an AI-generated image of a shark wearing shoes. This video gained 7 million views.

== Description ==
Italian brainrot is characterized by absurd images or videos created using generative artificial intelligence. It typically features hybrid figures combining animals with everyday objects, foods, and weapons. They are given Italianized names or incorporate stereotypical Italian cultural markers and are accompanied by AI-generated audio narration in Italian, which is often nonsensical. The names of these characters often have Italian suffixes, such as -ini or -ello.

The term brain rot was named Oxford Word of the Year in 2024, and refers to the deteriorating effect on one's mental state when overconsuming "trivial or unchallenging content" online. The term can also refer to the content itself. Online users often use this label to acknowledge the ridiculousness of Italian brainrot, while recognising the growing amount of AI slop present online. Fans have created various stories featuring characters from Italian brainrot, which has been described as a form of internet folklore with overly dramatic vocal delivery and increasingly exaggerated versions.

== Characters ==
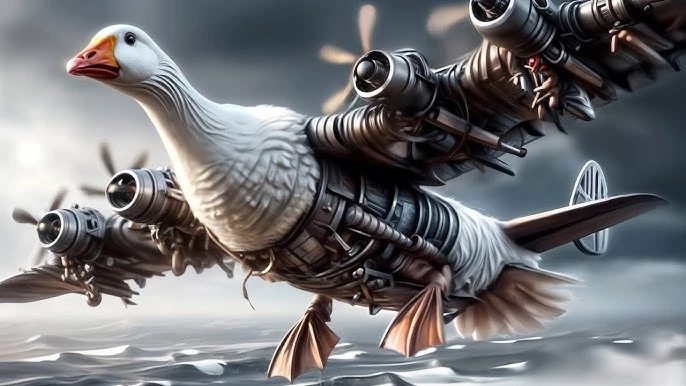
Bombombini Gusini

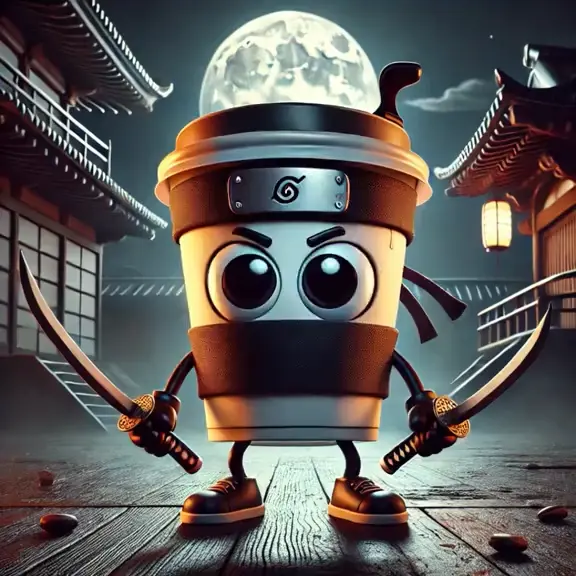
Cappuccino Assassino

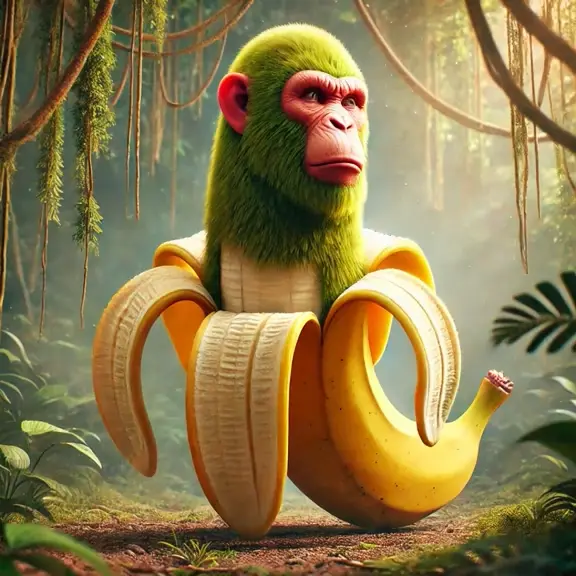
Chimpanzini Bananini

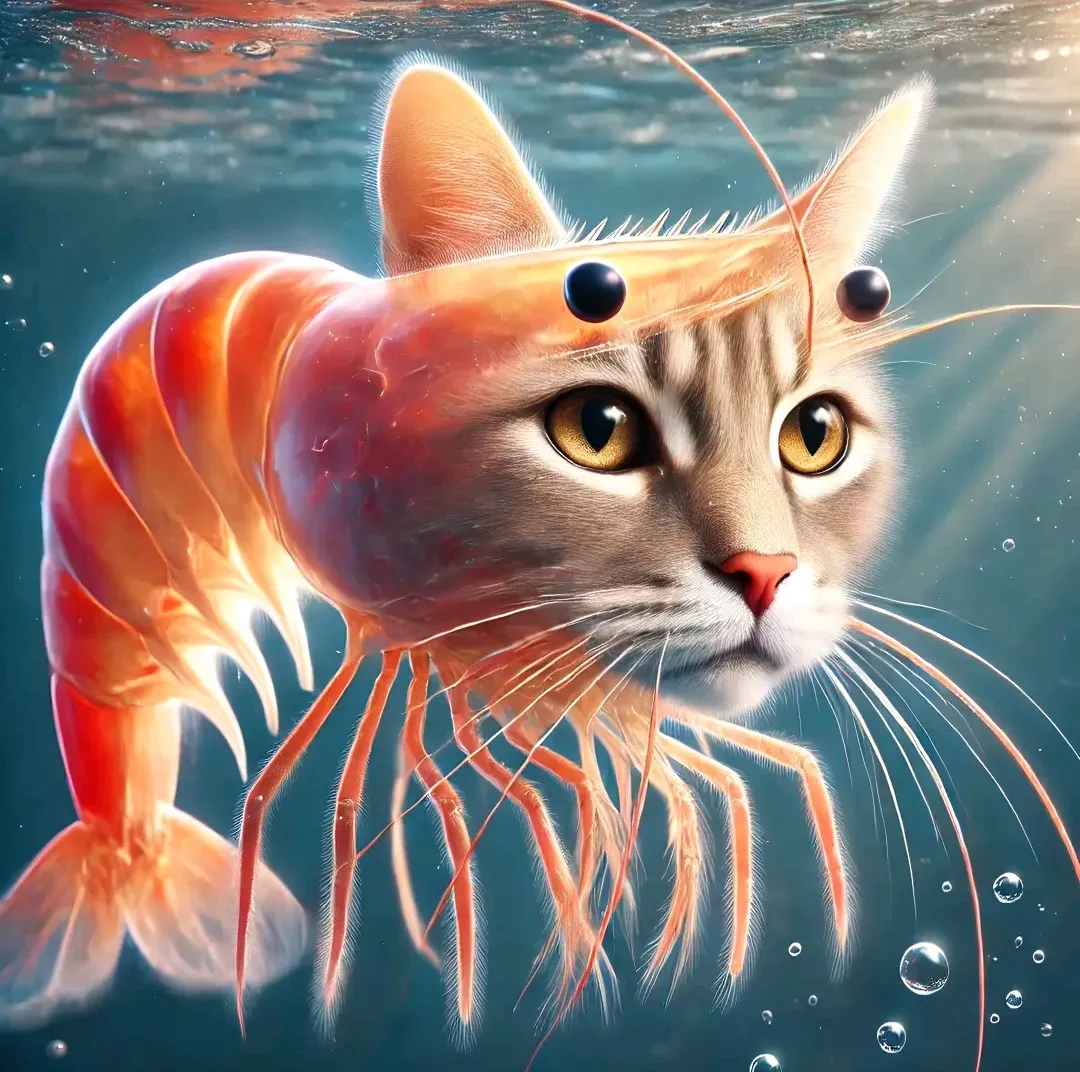
Trippi Troppi

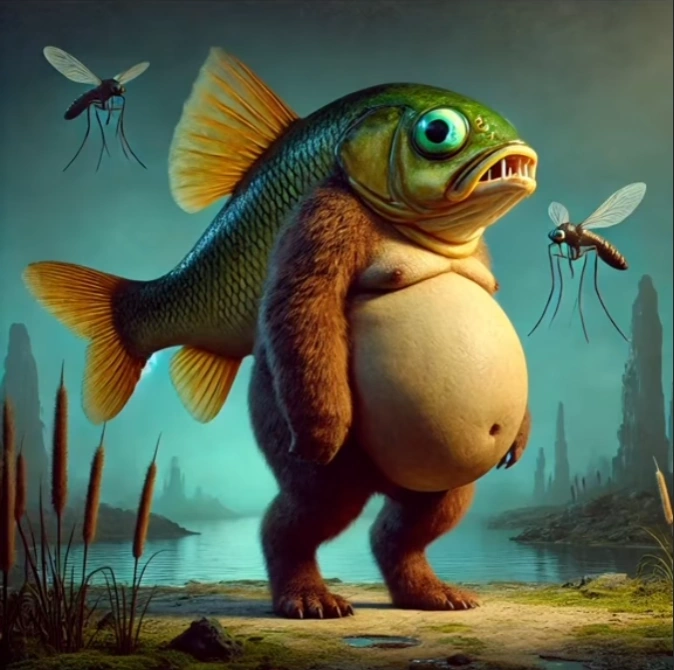
Alternative version of Trippi Troppi

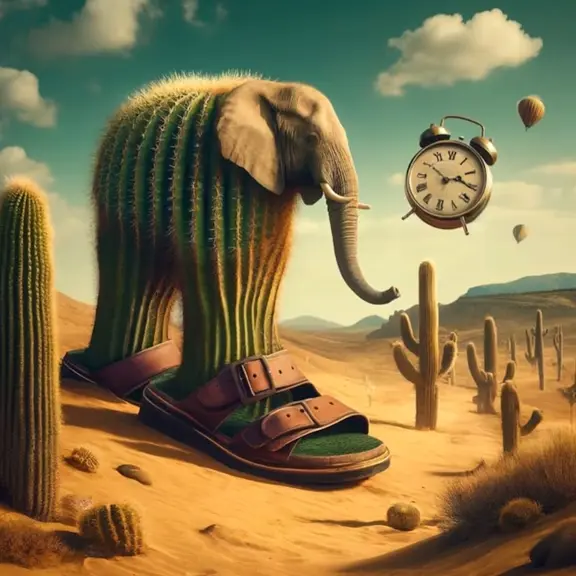
Lirili Larila

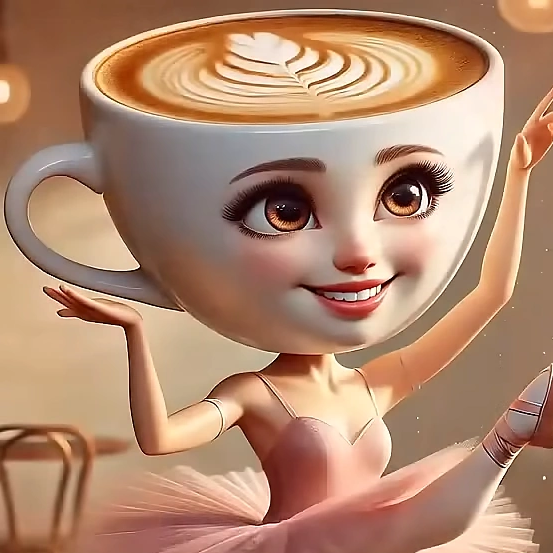
Ballerina Cappuccina

Italian brainrot features various AI-generated characters (referred to as just "animals"). Several characters are hybrids, often combining animals with everyday objects and various fruits.

Tralalero Tralala
The first viral character of the genre – a three-"legged" shark wearing Nike sneakers. It is described as athletic, being able to run at superhuman speeds and jump high.

Tung Tung Tung Sahur

An anthropomorphic wooden log who holds a wooden bat. Although considered part of Italian brainrot, it has Indonesian origin. The "Tung Tung Tung" in its name is onomatopoeia of how Indonesians traditionally beat kentungan slit drums to commence sahur, the pre-dawn meal that Muslims eat before fasting during Ramadan. The word tung also means "rumbling" in Sundanese, spoken in Indonesia. @noxaasht originally made the character in February 2025, and it has become its own meme outside the context of Italian brainrot.

Bombardiro Crocodilo (Note: Commonly misspelled as Bombardino Crocodilo or Bombardilo Crocodilo.)
A hybrid creature with the head of a crocodile and the body of a World War II-era twin-prop bomber. He is the brother of a goose with fighter jet wings named Bombombini Gusini. In its lyrics, it is said to be bombing civilians in Gaza.

Trippi Troppi
Often depicted as a cat with a shrimp's body, though some videos use the name to describe an obese bear with the head of a fish. The latter design has been nicknamed the "King of the Sea".

Ballerina Cappuccina (Note: Commonly misspelled as Ballerina Cappucina.)
A female ballerina wearing a tutu and pointe shoes with a cappuccino mug as a head. The original meme featured her pirouetting gracefully. She has been described as being married to a ninja named Cappuccino Assassino until she cheated on him with Tung Tung Tung Sahur. She also has a sister named Espressona Signora.

Chimpanzini Bananini
A chimpanzee with a banana as a body, who has been described as "indestructible" and considered one of the genre's "main characters".

Lirili Larila
A bipedal cactus–elephant hybrid wearing sandals that resemble Birkenstocks.

== Reception ==
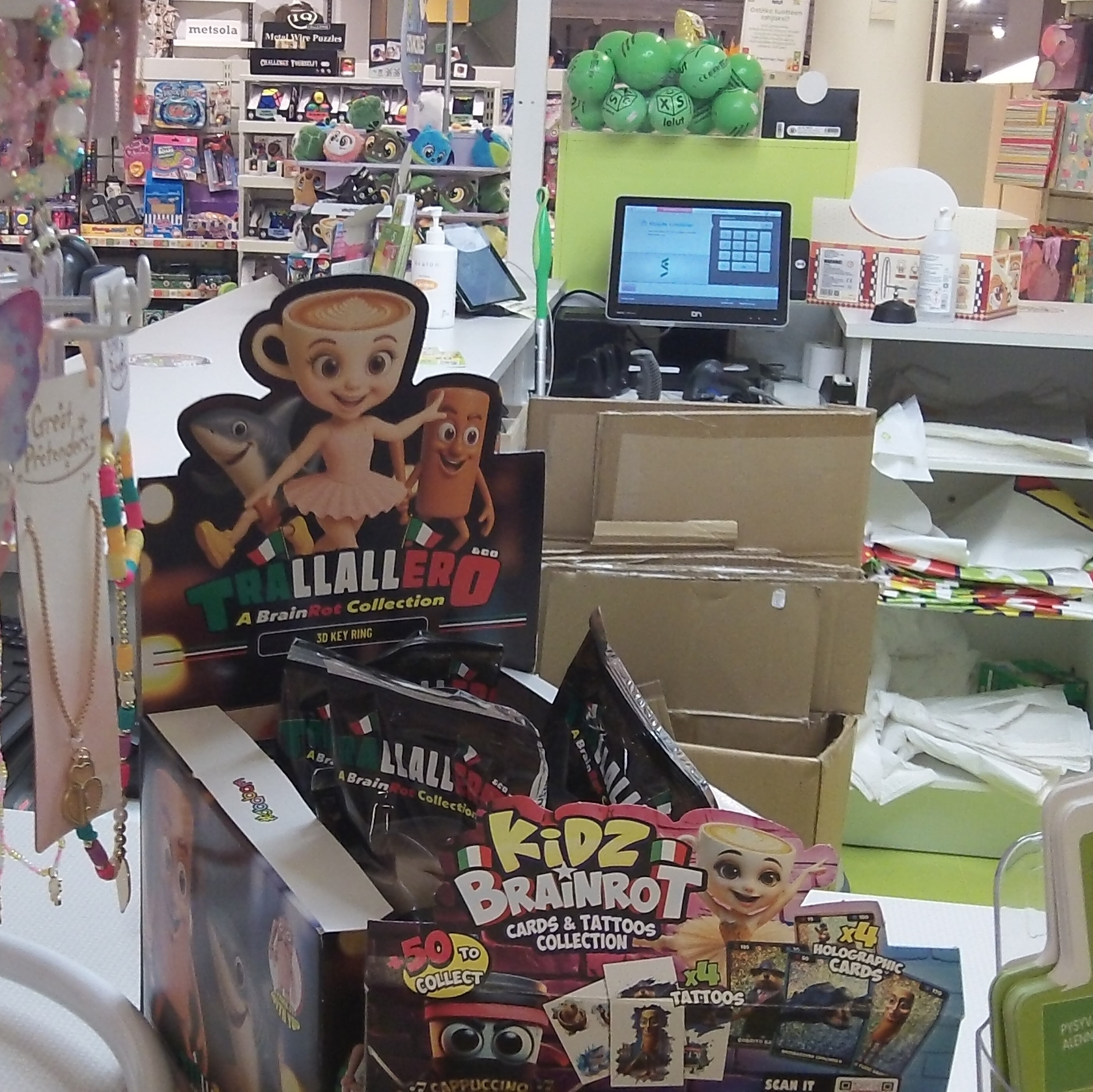
A counter-top display box for "Kidz Brainrot" cards and temporary tattoos in a toy store in Helsinki, Finland, in October 2025

Italian brainrot gained notoriety in many regions such as the United States, South Korea, and Germany. Various brands have replicated the memes for use in marketing content on social media. Polish radio channel Polskie Radio noted that the meme is popular among Generation Alpha "because it's stupid, funny, and veeeery addictive". Polskie Radio highlighted how the meme has been adapted into other media, such as Roblox games, music remixes, and quizzes. Radio France Internationale called the usage of pseudo-Italian names amongst characters "a bit problematic". Daily German newspaper Die Tageszeitung called Italian brainrot a "creative approach to technology, language, and pop culture". China's Legal Daily compared its popularity among young children in the country to Elsagate.

The likenesses of some Italian brainrot characters have been used to sell toys and non-fungible tokens (NFTs), as well as being the centerpiece of the popular Roblox game Steal a Brainrot. Italian brainrot also inspired a variety of volatile meme coins, such as "Italianrot", which was launched in March 2025. In Italy, several newsstands began selling "Skifidol Italian Brainrot Trading Card Games", inspired by the memes and commercialized for a younger audience. The release led to a noticeable rise in Generation Alpha consumers, with L'Espresso comparing the surge to the popularity of Garbage Pail Kids cards during their Italian debut. In 2025, Panini released an Italian brainrot sticker album.

Hungarian prime minister Viktor Orbán released a TikTok video where a 3D model of Tung Tung Tung Sahur is seen dancing in a government meeting.

Tung Tung Tung Sahur and Ballerina Cappuccina skins were added to Fortnite Battle Royale in April 2026. Prior to release, the skins faced criticism for the inclusion of characters based on AI-generated media, with Ballerina Cappuccina being voted by fans as the lowest-rated skin.

=== Controversial audio ===
Some Muslim TikTok users have spoken against the Italian brainrot trend, as the original audio accompanying Tralalero Tralala includes blasphemy against God. Some have pointed out, however, that blasphemy is often used casually as a filler word in Italian, and there was no anti-religious and Islamophobic intent. Additionally, Bombardiro Crocodilo has been criticized for making light of war crimes in the Gaza war, since some videos using his Italian narration describe the character as a creature who performs bombing raids in Palestine. This has caused concerns regarding casual cruelty and desensitization. The full narration is as follows:

Bombardiro Crocodilo, un fottuto alligatore volante, che vola e bombarda i bambini a Gaza e in Palestina. Non crede in Allah e ama le bombe. Si nutre dello spirito di tua madre. E se hai tradotto tutto questo, allora sei uno stronzo. Non rompere la battuta, prostituta.
Bombardiro Crocodilo, a fucking [sic] flying alligator, who flies and bombs children in Gaza and Palestine. He doesn't believe in Allah and loves bombs. He feeds on your mother's spirit. And if you've translated all of this, you're an asshole. Don't ruin the joke, prostitute.

— TikTok video

== Copyright status ==
The copyright status of AI-generated content is an area of active litigation. A lawsuit between the French company Mementum Lab (representing the original prompters and claiming AI images can have copyright) and Do Big Studios (creator of the video game Steal a Brainrot and claiming Italian Brainrot is public domain) hinges on the legal ownership of the character Tung Tung Tung Sahur.

== See also ==
- Soviet brainrot – similar absurd Internet memes originating in 2026
