= Steal a Brainrot =

2025 Roblox video game

- One of the game's thumbnails, c. August 2025
- Developers: DoBig Studios; SpyderSammy
- Engine: Roblox Studio
- Platforms: Various: Windows; macOS; Android; iOS; iPadOS; PlayStation 4; PlayStation 5; Xbox One
- Release: May 16, 2025; 17 months ago
- Genre: Idle
- Mode: Multiplayer

Steal a Brainrot is a 2025 multiplayer video game developed by SpyderSammy (or simply known as Sammy) released on Roblox. The game centers around buying and stealing Brainrots—characters drawn from the Italian brainrot memes. Owned by DoBig Studios, Steal a Brainrot is the only Roblox game to have surpassed 25 million concurrent users (CCUs) and is the second to have surpassed 20 million CCUs, with the first being Grow a Garden. The game was popularized on social media, where players have shared strategy tips and viral clips of upset children who had lost their Brainrots.

== Gameplay ==
Stealing Brainrots while fending off other players is central to the game.

In Steal a Brainrot, players aim to acquire Brainrots—voxel characters based on the 2025 Internet meme, Italian brainrot—and build wealth. The player starts with a base to store their Brainrots and a small amount of currency. A conveyor belt bisects the map, offering players the opportunity to purchase Brainrots, which passively generate income over time. Players progress by purchasing rarer and more expensive Brainrots from the conveyor belt or stealing them from other players, a gameplay loop comparable to the sport, capture the flag. To defend against theft attempts, the base has a button which generates a temporary shield.

Players can purchase gear such as traps and items from the store to aid with defense or stealing, costing either in-game currency or Roblox's premium currency, Robux. Players can also "rebirth"—resetting their progress in exchange for better stats and additional currency. Like Grow a Garden, the developers host special events often called "admin abuse" in which exclusive characters can be obtained. Kara Phillips of PCGamer described these events as a "sensory overload".

== Popularity ==
Alongside Grow a Garden, Steal a Brainrot is one of the most popular games on Roblox of all time, and had an average concurrent users (CCUs) of one million in September 2025. In July 2025, Steal a Brainrot reached 7 billion visits, and had a peak CCU of 5 million players. In August 2025, Steal a Brainrot saw a peak CCU of 20 million, surpassing Fortnite, which previously held the all-time CCU record of 15.3 million.

On August 23, an event featuring a mock "admin war" between SpyderSammy and Grow a Garden's developer, Jandel, drove each game to break their respective CCU records: Grow a Garden reached at least 22.3 million CCUs, while Steal a Brainrot became the second Roblox game to surpass 20 million CCUs. Additionally, the event drove Roblox to achieve a new platform-wide CCU record of 47.4 million players, beating the July 2025 record of 32.69 million. On September 13, with their Extinct Event, the game saw a CCU peak of 24 million, surpassing the Grow a Garden record. In October, the game achieved a CCU peak of 25.4 million.

== Licensing and partnerships ==
Epic Games officially licensed Steal a Brainrot for use in the sandbox video game, Fortnite Creative. Titled Steal the Brainrot and released in July 2025, the replica beat the CCU record for a Fortnite Creative Island with its 400k CCU peak, breaking the previous record of 235k players achieved by Super Red vs Blue in May 2025. On September 13, the Island hit a new peak with 500k CCUs, temporarily surpassing that of the official battle royale mode. Epic Games CEO Tim Sweeney celebrated the game's success through a series of retweets.

In early September, Sammy voluntarily removed the Tung Tung Tung Sahur character from the game after a licensing dispute with its creator Noxa and the brand agency Mememtum Lab. The agency has stated that they are open to continued licensing talks. The character was added back to the game on November 29, 2025. The game is registered at the U.S Copyright Office (PA002544969). In October 2025, Spyder Games sued the creator of an unlicensed copy of Steal a Brainrot called Stealing Brainrots within Fortnite Creative, claiming that the Stealing Brainrots infringed on Spyder's copyrights. A film adaptation of the game is in the works, set to be produced by Story Kitchen in partnership with DoBig Studios.

In January 2026, Steal a Brainrot hosted a brief virtual concert in which Bruno Mars performed "I Just Might," the 2026 lead single of the album, The Romantic, making it the first time Mars has performed the album live, and the 2012 single, "Locked Out Of Heaven". Players were issued exclusive items and Brainrots during the concert. The event saw a peak of 12.8 million CCUs, as well as 10 million livestream watchers.

== Reception ==
Kaitlyn Peterson from Screen Rant describes the game as "addictive" due to its "lack of complexity and straightforward gameplay loop." Patricia Hernandez from Polygon criticized the game's pay-to-win mechanics, noting that "the best items are only available for cash," with "server administrator" abilities available for purchase.

Dominik Bošnjak of GameRant reported the game has attracted many cheaters, such as those who use automation scripts for cash collection and stealing. The game saw popularity on TikTok and YouTube, gaining tens of millions of views for stealing and strategy tips along with reactions of children crying after having their Brainrots stolen. Steal a Brainrot won in the category Best Creative Direction at the 2025 Roblox Innovation Awards.

== See also ==
- List of Roblox games – A list-topic about notable Roblox games
