= Bedug =

Large double-headed drum

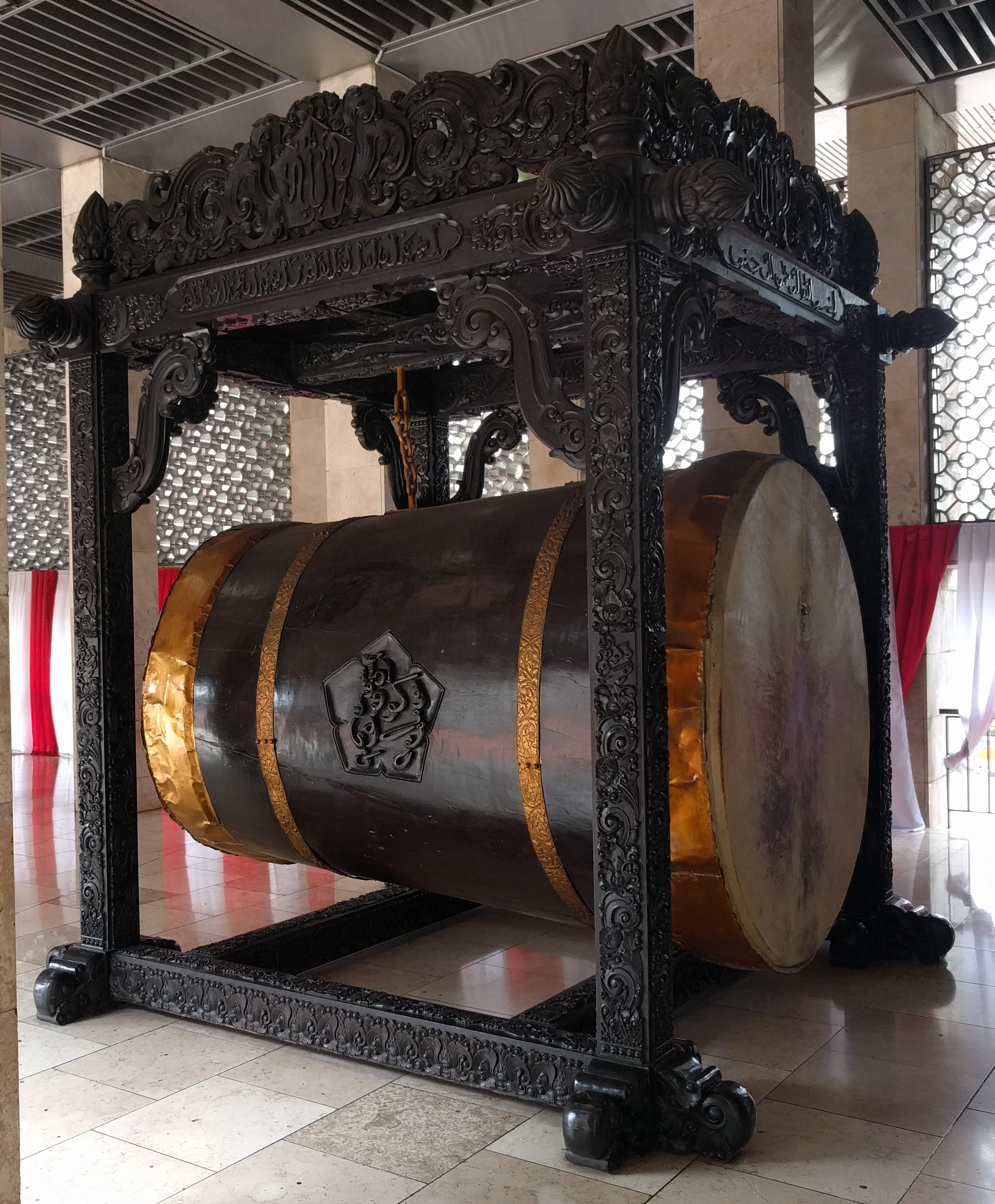
- A bedug in Istiqlal mosque, Jakarta.

Percussion instrument
- Other names: Beduk, Bedhug
- Classification: Membranophone
- Hornbostel–Sachs classification: 211.212.1 (Cylindrical drum)
- Developed: maritime Southeast Asia

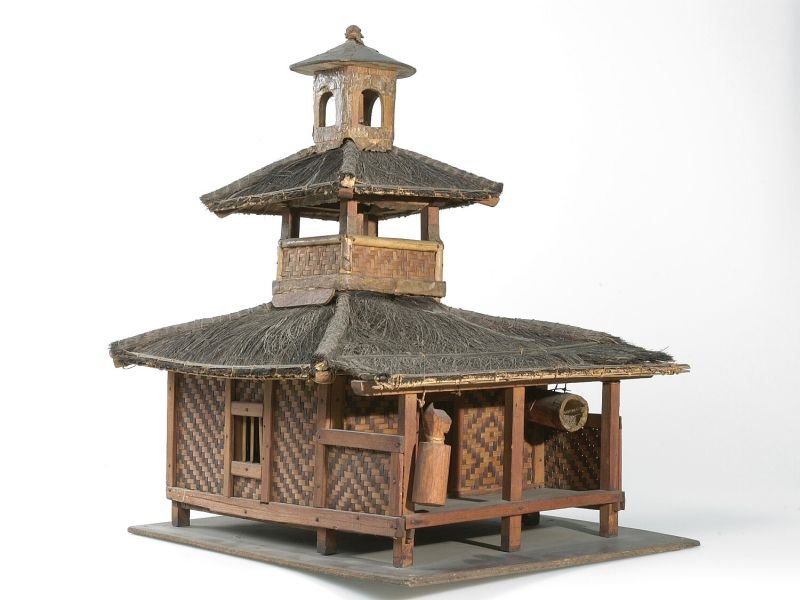
Model of a Sundanese mosque with bedug hung horizontally at lower right, front part of the building. To its left a slit drum is hung vertically.

The bedug (Note: Indonesian and Malaysian Malay: beduk; Javanese: bedhug; Sundanese: dulag) is one of the drums used in the gamelan. It is also played in mosques in Indonesia and Malaysia to signal prayer times. The hitting of the instrument is particularly done according to a rhythm that goes in an increasingly rapid (or accelerando) pace.

== Overview ==
A bedug is a large double-headed drum with water buffalo or cow leather on both ends.

Unlike the more frequently used kendang, the bedug is suspended from a frame and played with a padded mallet. The bedug is as large as or larger than the largest kendang and generally has a deeper and duller sound. The drum has pegs holding the two identical heads in place, similar to the Japanese taiko, and its pitch is not adjustable.

== Usage ==
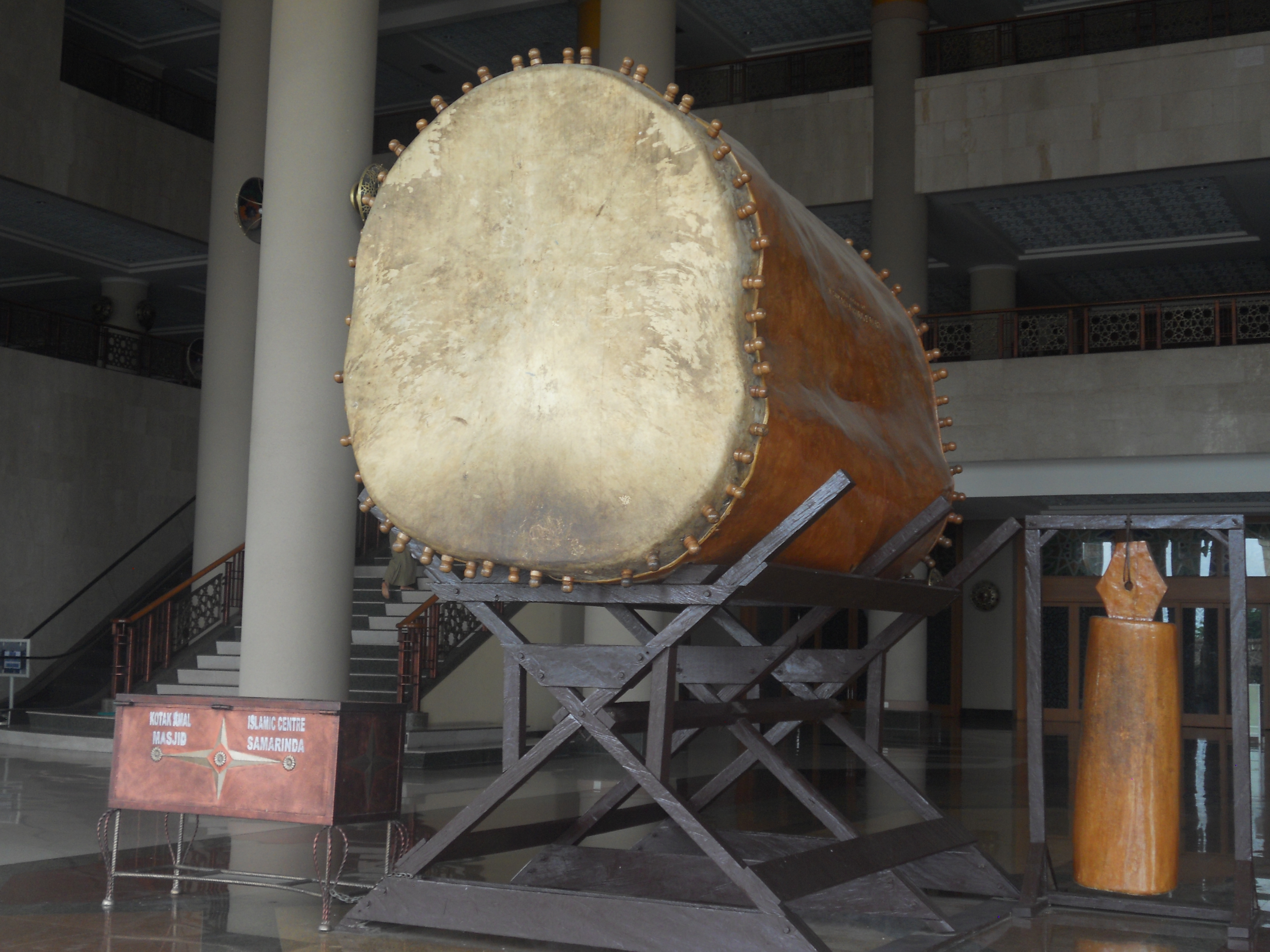
Bedug at the Samarinda Islamic Center mosque.

The bedug is not used in most gamelan performances, although it is included in some Yogyakarta kendang styles. It is used in special ensembles such as the gamelan sekaten, where it takes the place of the kempul. In some pieces it is played along with the kendang, especially to accompany dancing.

The bedug is commonly used in mosques in Java among Javanese and Sundanese people to precede the adhan as a sign of the prayer or during Islamic festivals. For example, the sound of a bedug is used to signal the end of the day-long fast during Ramadan and sometimes it is used to signal time for Suhoor during Ramadan. When used to signal time for Friday prayer, the bedug is beaten in a different way than for ordinary prayers.

The bedug is also used to celebrate takbiran, the night before Eid ul-Fitr following chants of takbir.

The tradition is also known among Sarawakian Malays who know it by the name teter.

Among the Muslim Maranao people of the southern Philippines, a similar and smaller drum is used for announcing prayer times, known as the tabu or tabo.

== See also ==
- Indonesian mosques
- Islam in Indonesia
- Islam in Malaysia
