= Skuf =

Offensive Russian-language meme

Skuf or skoof, also known as skufidon (Russian: скуф, скуфидон), is an Internet meme in the Runet (Russian-language Internet) that gained popularity in the 2020s. The term "skuf" refers to men over the age of 35 who appear unkempt, typically work in low-paying dead-end jobs, and spend virtually all of their free time drinking beer while browsing the Internet, watching television, or playing video games (especially Dota 2 and World of Tanks). Skufs are variously characterized with elements such as balding, being overweight, edema, messy facial hair, questionable hygiene, poor fashion sense, all of which make them appear older than their actual age.

== History ==
The meme originated from a user of the Russian imageboard Dvach – reportedly a politics board moderator named Alexey Skufyin. In 2018, Skufyin got into a political argument with another user, allegedly from Ukraine, and responded with a video message asking the user to stop "insinuations" and leave the thread. He did not conceal his appearance in the video, which later went viral.

As the clip spread, users uncovered personal information about Skufyin, including his home address and family photos, and mocked him online. He was eventually banned from Dvach, and his name became a meme. Those who resembled him in looks or attitude were nicknamed "skufs".

The meme resurfaced in 2023 on Instagram and other platforms, often in reels (short videos) portraying scenes from a "skuf's" life – playing games, drinking beer, or talking about politics. That same year, Skufyin gave a one-hour interview on the YouTube channel Xikkasgrandma.

By 2024, "skuf" had entered the slang vocabulary of Russian teenagers.

== In video games ==
The meme character voiced by underground singer Prophet Sanboy became the protagonist of the Russian visual novel Altushka ("alt girl") for a Skuf (Russian: Альтушка для скуфа).

== Memes and popular culture ==
The term "skuf" spawned numerous memes and jokes. Pop culture figures associated with the "skuf" archetype include characters played by Dmitry Brekotkin in Ural Pelmeni and Sergei Svetlakov’s Sergei Belyakov in Nasha Russia.

Many celebrities have been jokingly labeled as "skufs" based on appearance, including Leonardo DiCaprio, Elon Musk, streamer Ilya Maddison, blogger Yury Khovansky, and former Russian president Boris Yeltsin.

Derivative terms have emerged from the meme, such as "to skuf" (соскуфиться), "skufinya" (female skuf), and "skufization" (скуфизация).

Comedy film Skuf promised "witty exploration of social stereotypes, intergenerational tensions, and family relationships". It was planned for release in April 2026, however, the distributor removed it from the schedule because the distribution certificate was not received. There was no official explanations, however, it is suggested that this had happened because the main role was played by a controversial Ukrainian tiktoker Aleksandr Gubarev.

== See also ==
- Dad bod
- Alt girl
