= Suhur =

Islamic meal eaten before dawn time during Ramadan

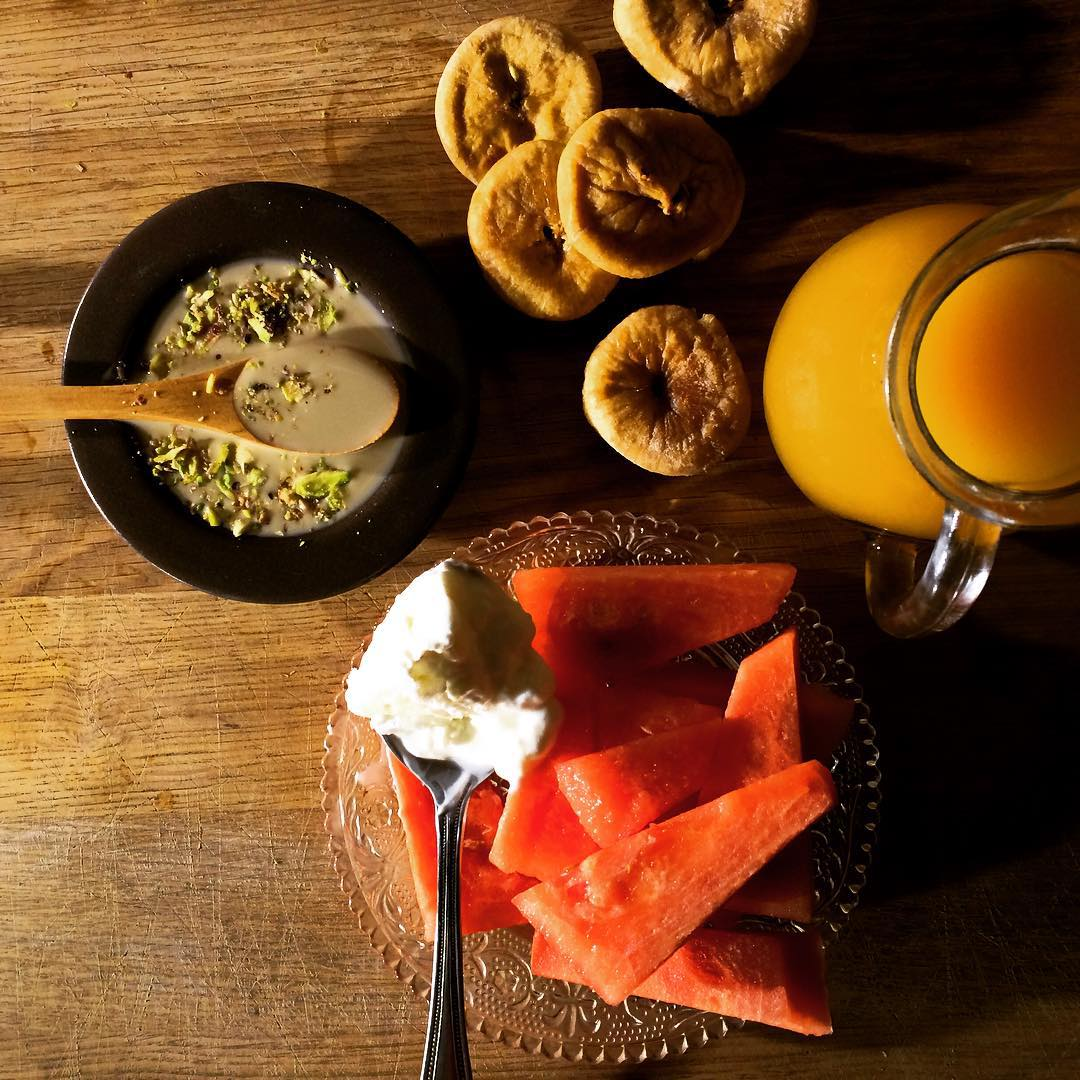
An example of a Jordanian sahur table

Suhur or sahur (UK: /səˈhɜːr/; Arabic: سَحُورٌ, romanized: saḥūr, lit. 'of the dawn', 'pre-dawn meal'), also called sahari, sahri, or sehri (Persian: سَحَری, romanized: sahari), is the meal consumed early in the morning by Muslims before fasting (sawm), before dawn during or outside the Islamic month of Ramadan. The meal is eaten before fajr prayer. Suhur corresponds to iftar, the evening meal during Ramadan, replacing the traditional three meals a day (breakfast, lunch, and dinner), although in some places dinner is also consumed after iftar later during the night.

Being the last meal eaten by Muslims before fasting from dawn to sunset during the month of Ramadan, suhur is regarded by Islamic traditions as a benefit of the blessings in that it allows the person fasting to avoid the crankiness or the weakness caused by the fast. According to a hadith in Sahih al-Bukhari, Anas ibn Malik narrated, "The Prophet said, 'take suhur, as there is a blessing in it.

Before the daily fast begins, Muslims wake early to eat a meal called suhur. This meal helps provide energy for the day of fasting and is often eaten shortly before dawn prayer.

Suhur is considered spiritually meaningful as it prepares believers for the day’s fasting and worship.

Across many Muslim communities around the world, suhur (the pre‑dawn meal before fasting) is often accompanied by specific cultural practices and traditional foods that reflect local tastes and dietary needs. In South Asian countries such as Pakistan and Bangladesh, families commonly eat paratha, lentils, yogurt, and fruits to provide sustained energy throughout the long fasting hours, while in Arab countries, dates, labneh (strained yogurt), eggs, and herbal teas are popular ones aimed at hydration and nourishment. Preparing suhur is also frequently treated as a social activity family members wake early to share the meal together and to offer prayers, strengthening communal bonds and spiritual readiness for the day of fasting ahead. Many nutritionists recommend that suhur includes a balance of complex carbohydrates, proteins, and fluids to help maintain energy levels and prevent dehydration during fasting.

== Musahharati ==
The musahharati (Arabic: مسحراتي, romanized: musaḥḥarātī; also anglicized as musaharati), also called "Ramadan drummer" in English, is a public waker for suhur and dawn prayer during Ramadan. According to the history books, Bilal ibn Rabah was the first musaharati in Islamic history, as he used to roam the streets and roads throughout the night to wake people up.

The occupation is described by a Damascene musaharati: "My duty during the holy month of Ramadhan is to wake people up in the old city of Damascus for prayers and Suhur meal." According to a Tripoli musaharati, the attributes every musaharati should possess are physical fitness and good health, "because he is required to walk long distances every day. He should also have a loud voice and good lungs, as well as an ability to read poems. A musaharati should supplicate God throughout the night to wake the sleepers."

The tradition is practiced in Egypt, Syria, Sudan, Saudi Arabia, Iraq, Jordan, India, Pakistan, Bangladesh, and Palestine. However, there has been a gradual disappearance of the musaharati due to several factors, including: Muslims staying up later; using technology such as alarm clocks to wake for suhur; and larger homes and louder cities that make the voice of the musaharati harder to hear. However, the old Dhakaiya tradition of singing qasidas can still be found in the streets of Old Dhaka in Bangladesh.

In Indonesia, a kentongan or a bedug is used to wake households up to eat the suhur meal.
