= Aztec music =

Musical traditions of the Aztec Empire

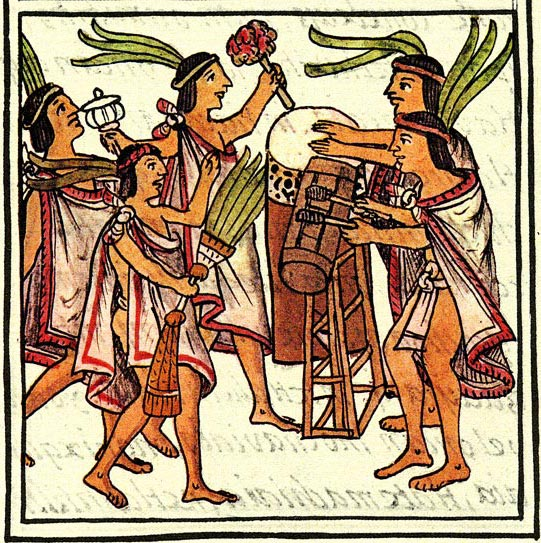
Aztec musicians, Florentine Codex

Music played an integral role in religious rituals among all classes of Aztec society. Instruments dating to 2500 BCE or earlier provide evidence for music culture in the region, but musical activity likely began much earlier. Music was used in the temples, palaces, and the homes of commoners to facilitate ritual activity. Musicians held a high status in Aztec society, and their education was extremely strict. Aztecs sang, and used percussion and wind instruments, but there is no evidence of string instruments in the Pre-Columbian Americas. The words of many songs survive across several codices, sometimes along with their composers' names, but there is no consensus on what additional markings in these manuscripts meant or exactly how the music sounded. Aztec musical culture influenced and was influenced by other Mesoamerican cultures through migration, trade, and invasion.

== Overview ==
Much of what is known about Aztec music comes from surviving instruments, the accounts of Spanish chroniclers, modern recordings of traditional music, and a variety of codices that illustrate musical activity before and after the Spanish arrived. A large body of music-related artifacts, discovered among the temple ruins of Tenochtitlán (CE 1325-1521), provide evidence of how music was organized in Aztec thought. In Tenochtitlán and surrounding cities, priests were responsible for playing music while attending to their ritual duties, and musicians were responsible for sounding the call to prayer four times a day and five times a night.

== Uses of Music ==
Head of Xochipilli-Macuilxochitl, deity of music, flowers, song, and games.

Music was strongly identified with religion in Aztec life, and was not used in secular contexts. Martens explained the link between music, dance, and ritual:

Even folk-melody - lullaby, war-song or occupational ballad - did not escape the religious inflection. All the business of life moved within a framework of minutely prescribed ritual acts and festival observances, in which music and the dance were linked with impressive display.

In Aztec society, music was usually a group activity and less often a means for individual expression. Some musical instruments were worshipped in the temples of Tenochtitlán. Aztec mythology regarded drums as associated with the sun and shell trumpets with the moon. The Aztec god of music was Macuilxochitl ("5-Flower") or Xochipilli ("Prince of the Flowers"), to whom at least three temples were dedicated in Tenochtitlán.

=== Temple and Palace ===
Multiple times per day, Aztecs engaged in collective, ritualized crying to implore their gods for forgiveness. In some rituals, periods of crying were interleaved with silence. After these solemn festivals, Aztecs sang, played instruments, and danced to songs that gradually increased their pitch and tempo. A ritual depicted in the Codex Mendoza includes nightly sacrificial rites, initially accompanied by wind instruments, followed by drums and chants. Prior to being sacrificed, a woman representing the goddess Xilonen would shake a rattle stick while wearing garments with bells. A ritual cycle concluded with the destruction of the instruments used.

Singers, musicians, and dancers played an important role in the coronation of the new tlatoani. Here, the tlatoque of Texcoco and Tlacopan led a dance in the palace, joined by 2,000 high-ranking guests bringing lavish gifts. The huehuetl was used during the tlatoani's dramatic entrance. Emperor Ahuitzotl (1440 CE – 1502 CE) was fond of music and used it for continuous entertainment in his house at all times of the day and night.

=== Household ===
Music accompanied almost all ritual activity in the home, and household excavations have revealed musical instruments. For example, houses in Xaltocan dating to the Middle to Late Postclassic period, as well as other sites, contained rattles that take various shapes, such as figurines, spheres with handles, or incense burner handles. Some female figurine rattles may have been used by midwives to assist the birthing process by helping the woman in labor to focus on rhythmic sounds. Ceramic flutes were decorated with flowers on the end to represent instrumental music, or "flowery song" (xochicuicatl). Human femurs, sometimes from sacrificed enemies, were fashioned into bone rasps inside the home, and the rasps were used at funerals and possibly other occasions. Other instruments uncovered within homes include flutes and whistles. Feasts were held in the home to commemorate life and calendrical events, where music and dance were common.

=== Military ===
Songs formed an important part of warrior training and were sung together by boys of different ages at the calmecac. During the imperial period, song themes and singing technique adopted a militaristic tone. Aztec military instruments included drums, conch shells, and whistles, and there was a band for each regiment in the Aztec army. The Aztec war drum was called tlalpanhuehuetl. During the siege of Tenochtitlán, singing was part of battle. Both the Spanish and the Aztecs sang, and "It was if both sides were challenging each other with their songs." Moreover, singing was used to help defend the city and provide warning of approaching enemies; young men in school were selected to sing in the evenings to keep watch.

== Education ==
Aztec schools for upper class children or gifted commoners were called calmecac, and included music education. Teachers, known as Tlamacazque, would teach children "divine songs", while Tlapizcatzin prepared musicians for religious services, and Ome Tochtzin managed musical performances. The calmécac in Tenochtitlán served as the national music conservatory for the Aztecs, and by 1450 CE it was a model for music schools in surrounding cities. Music education in Aztec society was extremely rigid:

Absolutely flawless performances were demanded, such as only the most highly trained singers and players could give. Imperfectly executed rituals were thought to offend rather than to appease the deities, so that errors in the performances of ritual music, such as missed drumbeats, carried the death penalty.

In Texcoco and Tacuba, music and dance were taught in schools called cuicacalli ("the house of songs"). In the cuicacalli, distinct professionals played different roles. The cuicapiqui developed themes, the cuicano composed the text and music, and other directors managed music and choreography. Boys and girls attended public schools called techputcalli which included instruction in singing and playing instruments. Convent schools, attended by girls of high social status, prominently featured music education and included instruction from priests in singing, drumming, and flute playing. Public schools for both music and eloquence flourished.

The huehuetl drumming patterns may have been learned with a system of syllables, such as to and co for low pitches and ti and qui for high pitches. Thus a certain drumming pattern could be memorized by reciting "toto tiquiti tiquiti".

== Musicians ==
Court and temple musicians held high status, mingled with the powerful, and were exempt from paying tribute because of "their service to the community in preserving the memory of past glories." Since the Aztecs didn't use written music notation, musicians needed exceptionally good memories to perform; creativity was also prized. Despite this high prestige, no names of musicians are known. Náhuatl did not have a general term for musician, but instead many terms for specific types of players.

== Instruments ==
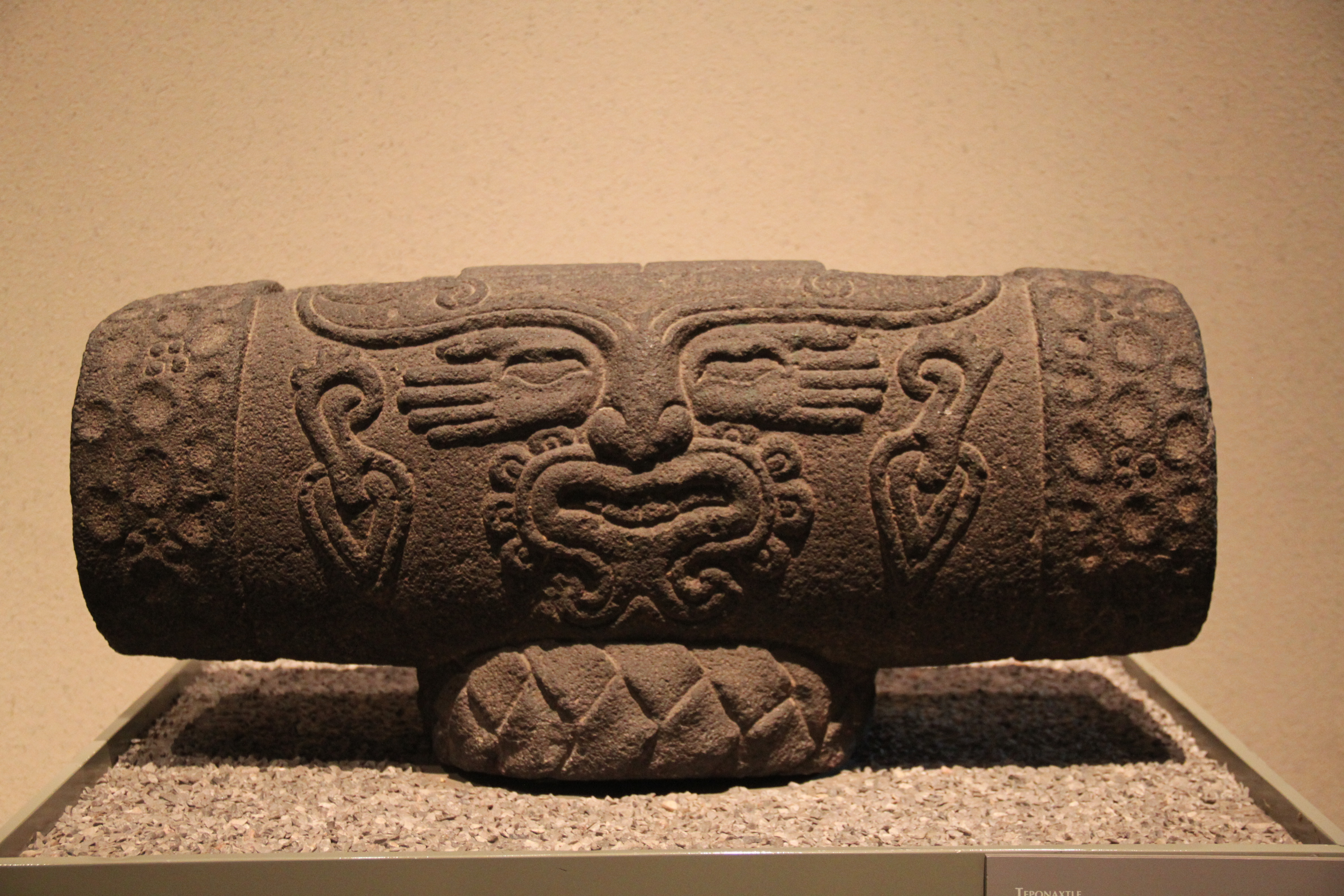
Aztec stone drum with image of Xochipilli

Aztec instruments have a long continuous history beginning c. 2500 BCE. They include voice, idiophones, membranophones, and aerophones. Ideophones and membranophones included drums, rattles, clattering instruments, and metallic instruments. Aerophones included trumpets and flutes. There is no evidence of string instruments among the Aztecs, with the possible exception of a musical bow.

The Aztecs used a variety of materials in making instruments. Drums and rattles were made of dried seed pods, conch shell, gold and copper alloy bells, ceramics, gourd, wood sticks, human femurs, deer shoulder blades, turtle shells, and stone. Drums beaten with the hands were covered with deer, coyote, ocelot, and jaguar hides. Trumpets were made of shell, ceramics, and vegetable material. Flutes were made of bone, reed, ceramic, and stone, and other aeorphones included whistles made of ceramics and skull. Aztec metalworkers made instruments such as the ayachitlitzi, chichahuazi, and trumpets. There is evidence that Aztecs classified their instruments into two main groups, distinguishable by the terminology for the player, such as a "drum beater" (hue-huetzotzonani), and "shell trumpet blower" (quiquizoani). In Aztec musical thought, instruments may have been classified according to the material they are made of or their symbolism. For example, drums and metallic sounds suggested royalty, fire, and the sun; shell trumpets suggested the moon and underworld.

=== Voice ===
The hierarchy of singers in Aztec music culture was recognizable to the Spanish when they arrived, and included positions that corresponded to the precentor, succentor, and choir.

=== Percussion ===
Aztec music was dominated by percussion, and the Aztecs tuned their drums carefully to produce bold, loud, and high pitched sounds that could be heard by the gods. Idiophones included various rattles, such as those made with seed pods, ceramic vessels, and gourds. Rattles were sometimes made into figurines or incense ladles. They also used rows of metal bells. A rattle stick painted blue called ayauhchicahuaztli ("instrument to strengthen the fog") was meant to ask the god Tlaloc for rain.

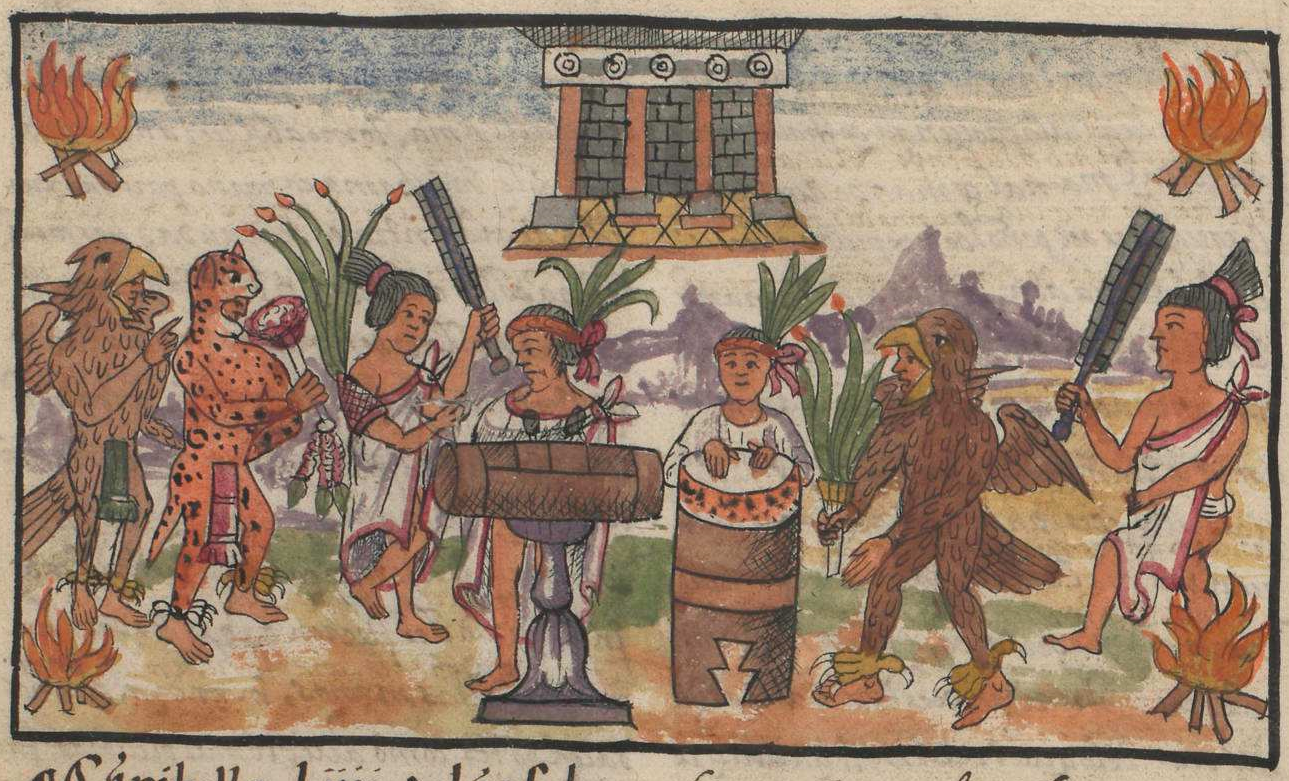
Depiction of the celebrations held for the coronation of emperor Moctezuma II of Mexico in the Durán Codex, folio 158 verso

Two of the most important Aztec drums include a slit-drum called a teponaztli played with mallets, and an upright drum called huéhuetl played with the hands. These drums were believed to be both musical instruments and gods "temporarily forced to endure earthly exile." In one telling of the myth, Teponaztli and Huehuetl were servants of the sun god who were banished to earth and made into the form of the instruments. The huéhuetl is a vertical drum made of wood, open at the bottom, and covered in jaguar or deer skin. The player beats the drums with the hand, adjusting pitch by drumming near or far from the center; tuning was achieved by heating the skin to tighten it. The teponaztli was a horizontal slit drum, made of tree trunk or stone, and cut into an 'H' shape to produce two tongues that produce a pitch when struck with a rubber-tipped mallet (olmaitl). The tongues were tuned to octaves, minor 3rds, major 2nds, or perfect 5ths. The drum has been described as producing a sad and far-reaching sound. Both of these drums are still in use today.

=== Wind ===
Trumpets were made of shell, ceramic, plants, or metal. Flutes were made of bone, reed, ceramic, and stone. Skull whistles were acoustically designed to produce an unusual wind-like sound.

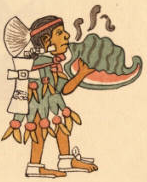
Conch shell trumpeter, Codex Magliabecchi

Aztecs used several types of flute (modern Nahuatl: huilacapitztli) made of clay, reed, and bone. The çoçoloctli was a ceramic spherical vessel flute containing between 5 and 8 holes. The tlapitzalli is an end-blown flute whose forms included straight, curved, and Y-shaped; it included a mouthpiece and a flared end, and was sometimes painted and decorated. A sacrificial victim played these instruments while ascending the pyramid steps, then broke the flutes prior to his sacrifice. The chichtli (or tlantquiquitli) was a whistle also connected to sacrifice, blown the night prior as the victims' hair was pulled from their heads. A 'royal flute' was another end-blown flute with a single chamber and 4 finger holes. The Aztecs attached the sac of a spider's egg over a hole near the mouthpiece, giving the instrument a distinctive buzzing sound.

The Aztecs referred to their conch shell trumpet (atecocoli), usually played in pairs, as ‘Wind God Quetzalcoatl; he who breathes life into a void’. The tecciztli and quiquiztli were similar wind instruments made from the shells of Strombus gigas and Fasciolaria gigantea, respectively. They were played by priests as calls to prayer as well as to mark sacrificial events.

The Aztec skull whistle produced a wind or hissing sound with low air pressure, but a "shrill, piercing, and scream-like sound" with high air pressure. The psychoacoustic properties of skull whistles have been studied. Sound recordings from two whistles from the Tlatelolco archeological site, Mexico City dating to 1250 CE – 1521 CE were obtained and played back to modern Europeans, who described the sound as scary and aversive. These whistles were likely used for ritual rather than warfare.

=== Surviving instruments ===
Over 100 pre-Columbian rattles have been found among Aztec-style figurines in a midden in Yautepec dating to as early as 1100 CE. Some have twisted handles and some are decorated with animal heads.

Ritual ceramic instruments, including whistles, rattles, bells, and flutes, were found among discarded items possibly related to a New Fire ceremony near Lake Texcoco.

== Works of music ==
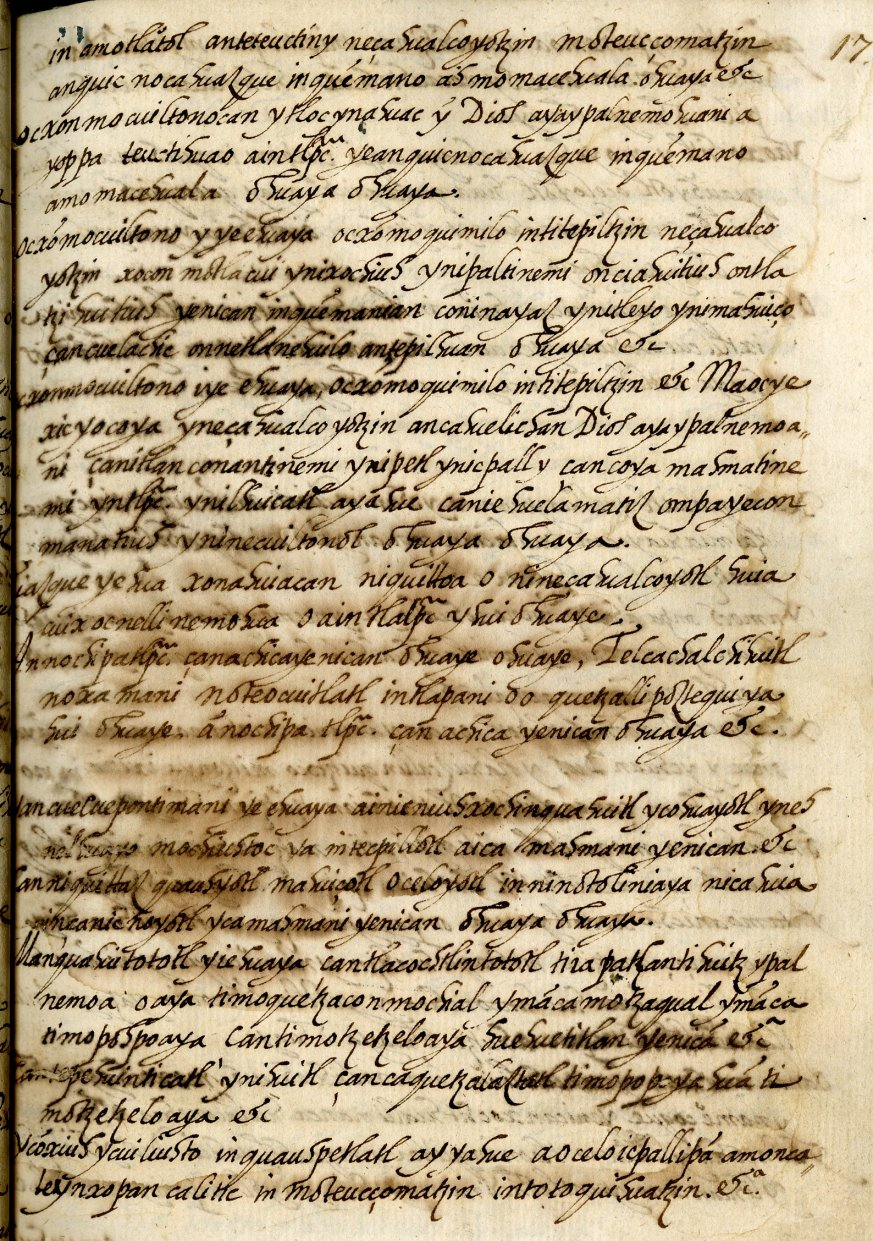
Leaf 17 of the Cantares Mexicanos

An important source of information about pre-conquest singing is the Cantares Mexicanos, a 16th century manuscript created by a Franciscan friar named Sahagún. In contrast to the Florentine Codex, which contains religious-oriented songs, the Cantares Mexicanos documents a wider variety of songs sung by the upper and lower classes around the time of conquest. These songs have a long oral tradition that extends back to pre-Columbian times, but have been gradually changed by Spanish influences or to fit the occasion, such as by substituting one honored figure for another. In one example, the Fish song was known to be performed twice in two contrasting contexts; one performance celebrated the Christian holiday of Epiphany, and another time for a separate occasion. The song contained themes related to the conquest, such as memories of pre-conquest times and the destruction of Tenochtitlán, and to celebrate friars and bishops who have helped them. On Nahua singer expressed a possible metaphor of the song in which the Spanish played the role of the fishermen, and the Aztecs played the role of the scattering fish attempting to escape.

Aztec poetry began as songs before being written down in documents such as in the Codex Mendoza. The Nahuatl word tlacuilo has been translated as “artist-scribe” or “painter-scribe”, But at least one Nahua poem refers to the tlacuilo interchangeably as "painter of books" or singer. Thus the tlacuilo could "perform the paintings" as either speech or song. One such work, translated by Leander and Bierhorst, contains this passage: “Pictures blossom: they are my drums. My words are songs. Flowers are the misery I create.... Ah! my songs, are a multitude of paintings.”

Culture and the arts flourished during the reign of Nezahualcoyotl, 1402 CE - 1472 CE (1 Rabbit - 6 Flint). His projects spanned aesthetics, architecture, poetry, and music. He built palaces and halls dedicated to the arts, where he held gatherings of artists and intellectuals influenced by Toltec tradition. His own poetry contains themes of the transitory nature of things on earth. In a passage from the Cantares he expresses this thought: "I, Nezahualcoyotl, ask this: / Is it true one really lives on the earth? / Not forever on earth, / only a little while here. / Though it be jade it falls apart, / though it be gold it wears away, / though it be quetzal plumage it is torn asunder. / Not forever on earth, / only a little while here." (Note: Cantares fol. 17 r.)

Macuilxochitzin (b. 1435, 5 Flower), was a poet and the daughter of Tlacaelel. She was educated from childhood. Her only documented song is a recollection of her father's last conquests, where she also noted the heroic role of a group of Otomi women in carrying out her father's plans for expansion. The first stanza of her song says: "I raise my songs, / I, Macuilxochitl, / with these I gladden the Giver of Live, / may the dance begin!" (Note: Cantares fol. 53 v.)

Lord Aquiauhtzin (c. 1430 CE - c. 1500 CE), a native of the small town of Ayapanco, wrote an erotic poem titled In Chalca Cihuacuicatl ("Song of the Women of Chalco") to both flatter and defy Axayacatl, to whom the song was presented. He wrote: "My friend, my little friend, you, / Lord Axayacatl, / if you are really a man, / here is where / you can fight to prove it.". He continued: "Is that all, / you don't have the strength to continue? / Get it up, make me a woman... / but no, not yet, do not take the flower, / you, lord, little man Axayacatl." (Note: Cantares fols. 72 r. - 73 v.)

== Composers ==
Multiple manuscripts, such as the Cantares and Romances, contain descriptions of composers and in some cases the text of their songs. Some of the songs and composers in these manuscripts pre-date the Spanish arrival, particularly those that are noted in the documents to be ancient. From these manuscripts, León Portilla selected 15 named poet-composers, whose works contain themes of war, sorrow, philosophy, supernatural beings, femininity, and friendship. Several female composers are known, such as Macuilxochitzin, 'Lady of Tula', and others.

In the Tezcoco region, Tlaltecatzin, active c. 1350 CE - 1400 CE, was a famous poet in this time. His only known song appears in two independent manuscripts with slight variation. (Note: Cantares fol. 30 r. and Romances fol. 7 r. - 8 v.) Nezahualcoyotl, 1502 CE - 1572 CE (1 Rabbit - 6 Flint), his life and deeds were documented in several manuscripts where he is described as a sage and composer. Cuacuautzin, d. 1440 CE (13 Flint), who has one song in the various manuscripts attributed to him, but was described as a prestigious song composer, and he is referred to by name in a song by Nezahualcoyotl. Nezahualpilli, 1464 CE - 1515 CE (11 Flint - 10 Reed), has just one song in the Cantares (Note: fols. 55 v. - 56 r.) which is about the war of Huexotzianco. Cacamatzin of Tezcoco, c. 1494 CE - 1520 CE, wrote a song of sorrow about his family. (Note: Romances, fols. 5 v. - 6 r.)

In Mexico-Tenochtitlán, Tochihuitzin Coyolchiuhqui, b. late 14th century, has two short songs (Note: Cantares, fols. 14 v. and 15 r.) both of which are deeply philosophical. Axayacatl, ruler of Tenochtitlán, has two known songs, (Note: Cantares fols. 29 v. - 30 r. and 73 v. - 74 v.) one of which is a song of sorrow, and the other a chant of old people. Other references in the Canatares (Note: fol. 60 r. and fol. 66) proclaim his fame. Macuilxochitzin was one of several known female composers. Her songs (Note: e.g., Cantares fol. 53 v.) contain themes of supernatural beings, war, and femininity. Macuilxochitzin was the daughter of Tlacaelel. Temilotzin, d. 7 Reed, praised friendship in a short chant (Note: Romances fol. 2 r.) and was well known to other composers named in the Cantares.

In the Puebla-Tlaxcala region, Tecayehuatzin, with several compositions attested to him, may have arranged a gathering of composers in Huexotzinco in the 15th century. Ayocuan Cuetzpaltzin composed several known songs (Note: Cantares, fols. v. 2 r., 12 r., and 14 v.) and was praised for his creativity. Xayacamach, ruler of Tizatlan in the 15th century, has two surviving poems (Note: Cantares, fols. 11 v. and 12 r.) and is named in the Cantares as having composed a "beautiful song". Xicohtencatl, a ruler and song composer, is mentioned by name in a chant (Note: Cantares, fols. 57 v. - 58 r.) Chichicuepon is named in Cantares, (Note: fol. 33 r.) which refers to the composer's untimely death. Lord Aquiauhtzin, native of a small town, became famous when one of his compositions (Note: Cantares, fols. 72 r. - 73 v.) was recited to Axayacatl, ruler of Tenochtitlán.

== Music theory ==
There is no evidence of an Aztec music notation. However, they did have a system of metric notation for the song verses. The Códices Matritenses and Florentine Codex contain twenty sacred hymns, epic and lyric chants, and songs focused on historical figures. Together there are 91 compositions in the Cantares. Two kinds of markings accompany the songs, both using a system of non-lexical syllables. One set of syllables indicate emphasis and rhythm, and another indicate tone and instrumental directions. Other theories suggest that the syllables represent pitches, or whether pitches are ascending or descending. In addition, the Romances de Los Señores de Nueva España contains approximately 60 Nauhuatl songs. In all three documents, indications are made that show categorization of genres, styles, and moods.

Aztec music was connected to numerology, spiritual realms, and the four cardinal directions.

== Influence ==
Aztecs admired Toltec art, poetry, and music, and attributed some of their songs to the Tolecs. Wisdom (tlamatilitzli) stretching back to the Toltecs influenced Aztec thought, brought by wise men who, according to a passage in the Codex Matritense de la Real Academia, (Note: Codex Matritense de la Real Academia, VIII, 192 r.) carried with them black and red ink, manuscripts and pictures, song books, and the music of flutes.

Early evidence for the slit-drum comes from a tomb in Kaminaljuyú (modern day Guatemala) in an archaeological site dating to 250 CE - 600 CE. An incense censer discovered there depicts a figure playing a slit-drum. The figure is dressed as an elite and painted to suggest supernatural power. The incense censer shares features in common with objects from the Teotihuacán culture to the north, a trading partner during this period. Although no slit-drum has been found in Teotihuacán, a clay figurine slit-drummer was found in Remojadas (modern Veracruz) along Teotihuacán-Kaminaljuyú trade routes. The use of rubber for the slit-drum mallet heads could suggest a southern coastal origin for the instrument. Other theories suggest that the slit-drum may have been developed by the Toltec (beginning c. 900 CE) and traveled southward through migration, trade, or invasion.

Influence of the Mesoamerican slit-drum can be seen in the West Indian mayohuacan and the Taino maiohavau. Larger variants of the log-drum have been played in North America, including the four corners region in the United States and the western coast of North America. The Californian Amerindians played a large log-drum with their feet by dancing on it, and the Pueblo Amerindians set the log drum into the floor of a kiva and played it with feet c 1000 CE. The North American log drums did not have slits.

Aztec consolidation of power standardized instruments across the region; by the time of the European arrival, instruments played by the Aztecs, Tarascans, Otomís, Zapotecs, Mixtecs and Mayas "greatly resembled each other, with only the names differing in the respective aboriginal languages." Catholic missionaries exploited Aztec interest in music as a way to convert them, teaching Aztec musicians Spanish instruments and singing, and introducing them to European composers. Among a variety of Nahuatl speaking peoples, dances or ballet-dramas related to memories of the conquest included music, song, and dance.

Aztec music was not always well-received by the Spanish. Captain Bernal Diaz expressed his disdain:

That which the Mexicans did by night in their great, huge cues (towers) was to play their damned drum, and I say again that its sound was the most accursed and sad that might conceivably be made, sounding for a great distance; and they played other and worse instruments."

== See also ==
- Maya music
- Maori music
