= Atilogwu =

Traditional dance from the Igbo ethnic group

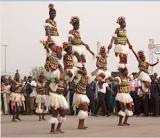
Atilogwu 1

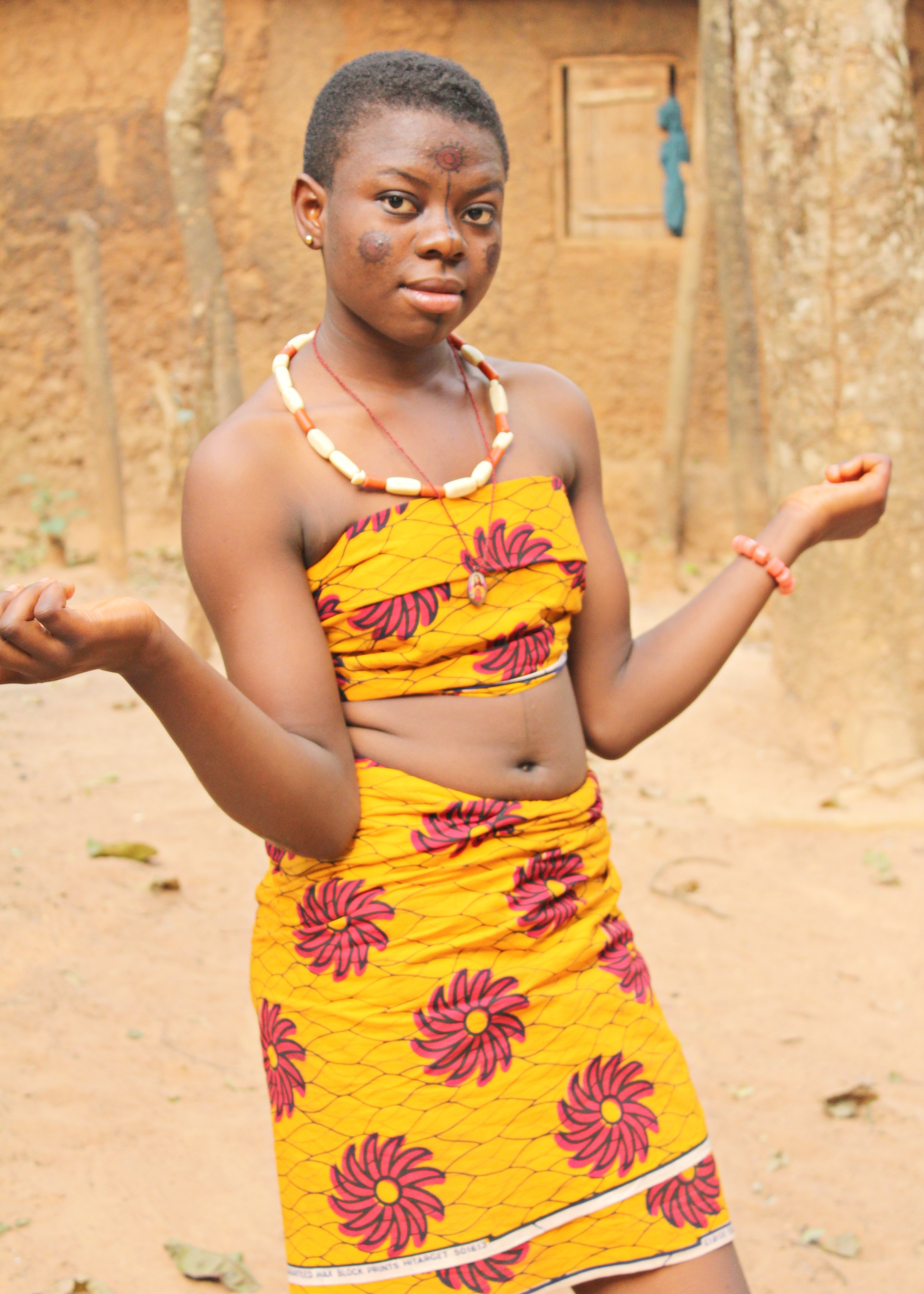
Atilogu Dancer - Igbo Tribe - Oji River - Enugu State - Nigeria

Atilogwu is a spirited youth dance from the Igbo ethnic group of Nigeria that focuses on vigorous body movement and often includes acrobatics. In the Igbo language, the word itself "Atilogwu" translates into "has magic, as in sorcery/witchcraft".

The name stems from rumors that bewitchment or magic potions had to be involved if the children of the village could perform so exuberantly and energetically, while making it look so effortless. The tempo of the dance matches the tempo of the music, which is dependent on the beat of the drum and ogene, a metal gong instrument. The dance is usually performed during festivals and the festivity will also include exotic dishes created from authentic Nigerian recipes, served buffet style.

== History and origins ==
Accounts of. Atilogwu’s origins has been placed the Enugu area. MacKay, in his collaboration with dancer Augustine Ene, locates the dance in the Udi Hills near Enugu. Uwaoma, however, gives Ezeagu, Enugu as its place of origin.

Odunze provided a traditional explanation for the Atilogwu name, explaining that spectators who were astonished by the dancers’ displays, were said to have asked “A tighala ogwu?” Igbo words translated to mean as “Is this magic?” Odunze also described the Ile-Wonder Atilogwu of Umunede as a local form related in technique to Atilogwu in Igbo communities, and says that it has changed over time as dancers added steps and stunts.

MacKay and Ene reported that Ene’s troupe won a silver cup at the 1952 Nigerian Festival of Arts. They also noted that Ene performed on the BBC television programme Panorama in 1956, and that he used recordings made by Atilogwu musicians in Eastern Nigeria to accompany his performances in Britain.

== Performance ==
Atilogwu is described as a high-energy group dance which involves a rhythmic footwork, vigorous body movement and acrobatic displays. Adumati provided a theatrical production perspective which involves repeated jumps, swinging arms, shaking the waist and measured foot taps, followed by a choreographed acrobatic display. This also vary by other sequence used by other dance troupe.

Uwaoma recorded that the lead dancer is called the “Otu Ugo” (“wearer of the eagle feather”), who also leads the row of dancers. The leader typically introduces variations, which the other dancers imitate, and gives movement cues. The “Iru nuo” chant was for forward movement and “Azu nuo” for backward movement. The principal dancer, called “Nnekwu Uno” sometimes perform solo while accompanied by a flautist, and using leaps, turns and swaying movements.

The Ile-Wonder Atilogwu includes high jumps, flips, twists and a stunt in which dancers climb and fall from a human formation. The flute player usually sets the pace as to when the music and dancing become faster or slower together, while leg rattles accent the dancers’ foot stomps.

== Music ==
Descriptions of Atilogwu music vary by performer and community. MacKay and Ene list percussion instruments and an oja whistle-flute in the ensemble they observed, including the alo or ivom, ogene, gedegwu, ekwe and ichaka. The alo provided cues for the dancers’ steps. For the War dance sequence in Ene’s performance, a small drum called the igna was also used.

Odunze’s account of the Ile-Wonder Atilogwu of Umunede includes drums, the flute-like opi, the ogene, the wooden slit-drum ekwe and the beaded gourd ichaka. In this sequence also, the dancers’ steps follow the rhythm of the drums and ọjà.

== Costume ==
MacKay and Ene describe a costume consisting of a short skirt or cloth tied around the waist, with seed rattles worn at the waist, below the knees and around the ankles. The headdress varied in size and elaboration, and that a troupe leader might wear tall plumes. In the War dance sequence, the leader carried a stylised sword while the other dancers carried small triangular palm-leaf akupe. For his performances to European audiences, Ene wore a brightly coloured fringed skirt and handmade soft boots. This was described to be a presentation choice for those performances.

There are also other accounts that describe different costumes in particular performances. Odunze reports a top, raffia skirt and leg rattles for the Ile-Wonder Atilogwu of Umunede. Anither description of the stage production recorded that the women wore colourful short skirts and tops, decorated their hair and carried hand fans, while the men wore white singlets and short wrappers; the group’s leader carried a long black horsewhisk.

Atilogwu costumes colourful includes a brightly striped red, yellow and green outfits.

== Occasions and contemporary performances ==
Atilogwu and related performances are typically displayed ar festivals and public events including coronations, the New Yam Festival and marriage ceremonies among occasions for the Ile-Wonder Atilogwu of Umunede. There is also an adoration sequence associated with harvest thanksgiving, as well as Hunting and War sequences in Augustine Ene’s account.

Atilogwu has also been incorporated into staged theatre productions, where youths perform it before a character’s political speech, or as part of a production representing Nigeria’s regional cultures.

== See also ==
- Dance culture in Nigeria
