= Ichaka =

Traditional musical instrument of the Igbo people

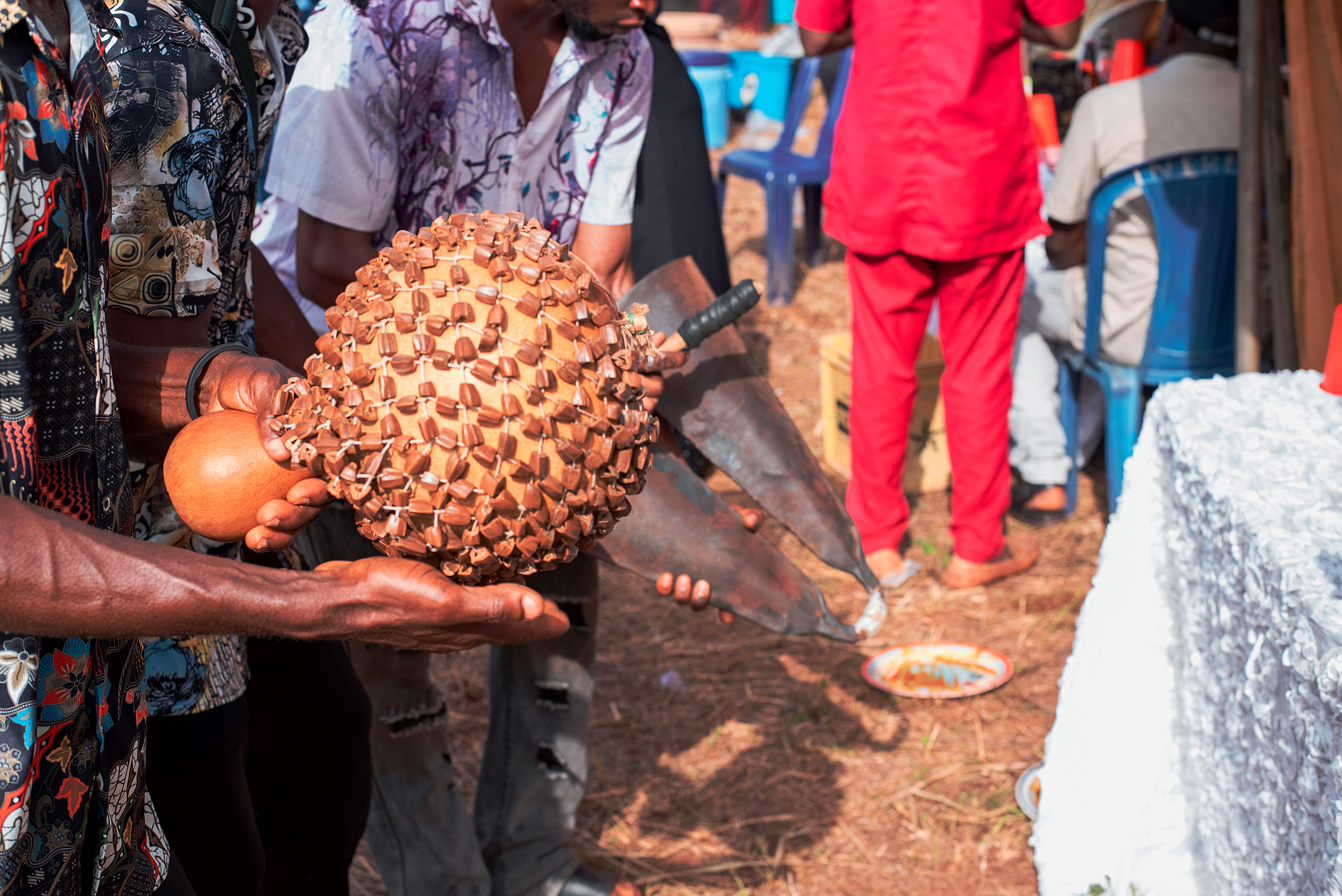
- A performer playing the ichaka at a community event in southeastern Nigeria
- Other names: Ichake, Ishaka, Ukwusa, Osha
- Classification: Idiophone, rattle
- Hornbostel–Sachs classification: 112.13 (Vessel rattles)
- Developed: Igboland, southeastern Nigeria

Related instruments
- Güiro, Axatse

The Ichaka (also spelled ichake or ishaka; also known as ukwusa or osha in some dialects) is a gourd rattle of the Igbo people of southeastern Nigeria. It consists of a dried gourd covered with a net of beads on the outside. When shaken or tapped, the beads strike the gourd surface and produce a dry rattling sound. The instrument is classified as an idiophone.

The Ichaka originates among the Igbo people of southeastern Nigeria. Similar beaded gourd rattles can also be found across African, Caribbean, Afro-American, and Latin American communities.

== See also ==
- Igbo music
- Ogene
- Ekwe
- Udu
- Ọjà
- Shekere
