= Huiringua =

The huiringua, kuiringua, kiringua, quiringua, cuiringua is a percussion instrument of the group of slit drums. It consists of a hollow log with closed ends with a slit along the instrument. The shell becomes the resonating chamber for the sound vibrations created when the slit is struck with a pair of wood mallets.
