= Slit drum (Vanuatu) =

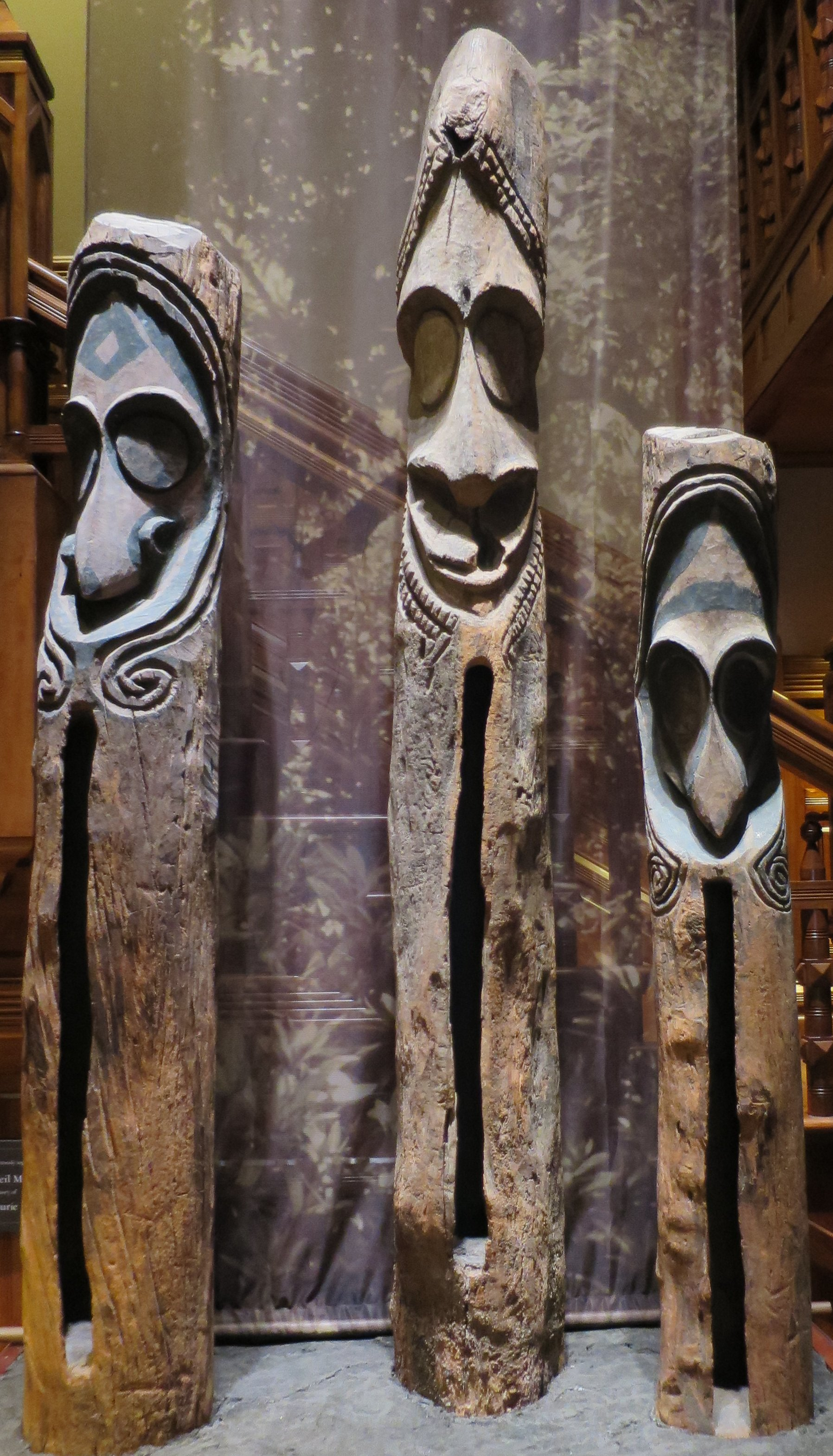
Slit drums from the Bernice P. Bishop Museum.

In Vanuatu, a slit drum is a musical instrument that is traditionally played by men of high rank.

In most islands of Vanuatu, the drum has little to no decoration, and is played horizontally on the ground. On the island of Ambrym though, such drums stand vertically on the ground; they are decorated with one or several faces with disk eyes, representing ancestral figures; such a figure is called atingting kon. The distinctive shape of these Ambrym drums has made them iconic of Vanuatu as a whole. They are frequently found in museums around the world, represented on Vanuatu banknotes, and featured in the tourism industry.

== Cultural significance ==
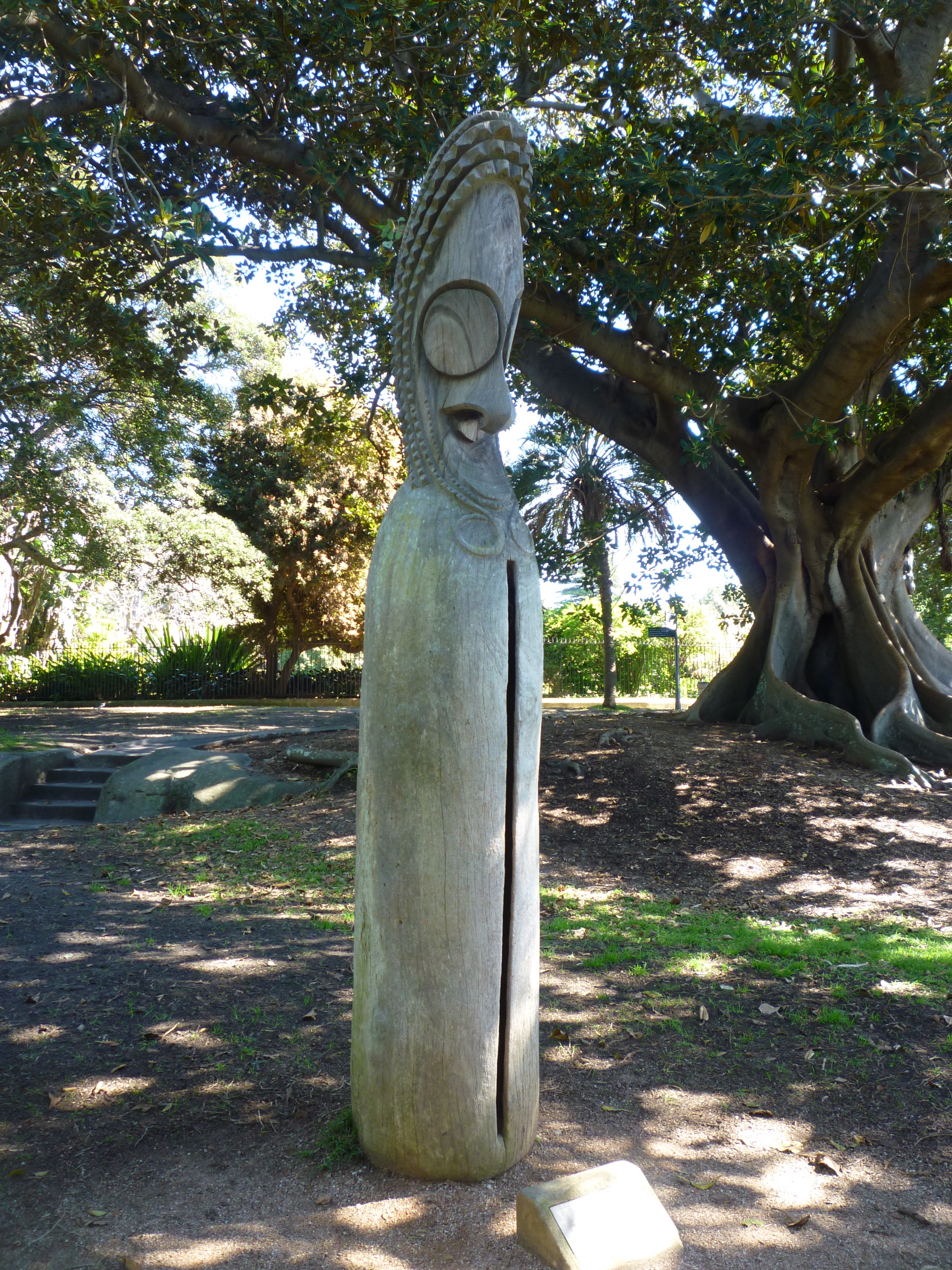
Slit drum from Ambrym, Vanuatu in Royal Botanic Garden, Sydney

Slit drums, whether decorated or not, hold significance in Vanuatu's traditional economy and society; they serve as symbols of a man's wealth and social status within the graded political system. The drums are sometimes found at ceremonial dance grounds and other gathering places. They have been used for dance rhythms, but also for signalling purposes. Atingting drums are thought to hold spirits, whether good or bad; they are often posted upright at the perimeter of a property or outside a house as a protection.

== See also ==
- Slit drum
- Music of Vanuatu
- Culture of Vanuatu
