= Agung a tamlang =

Philippine slit drum

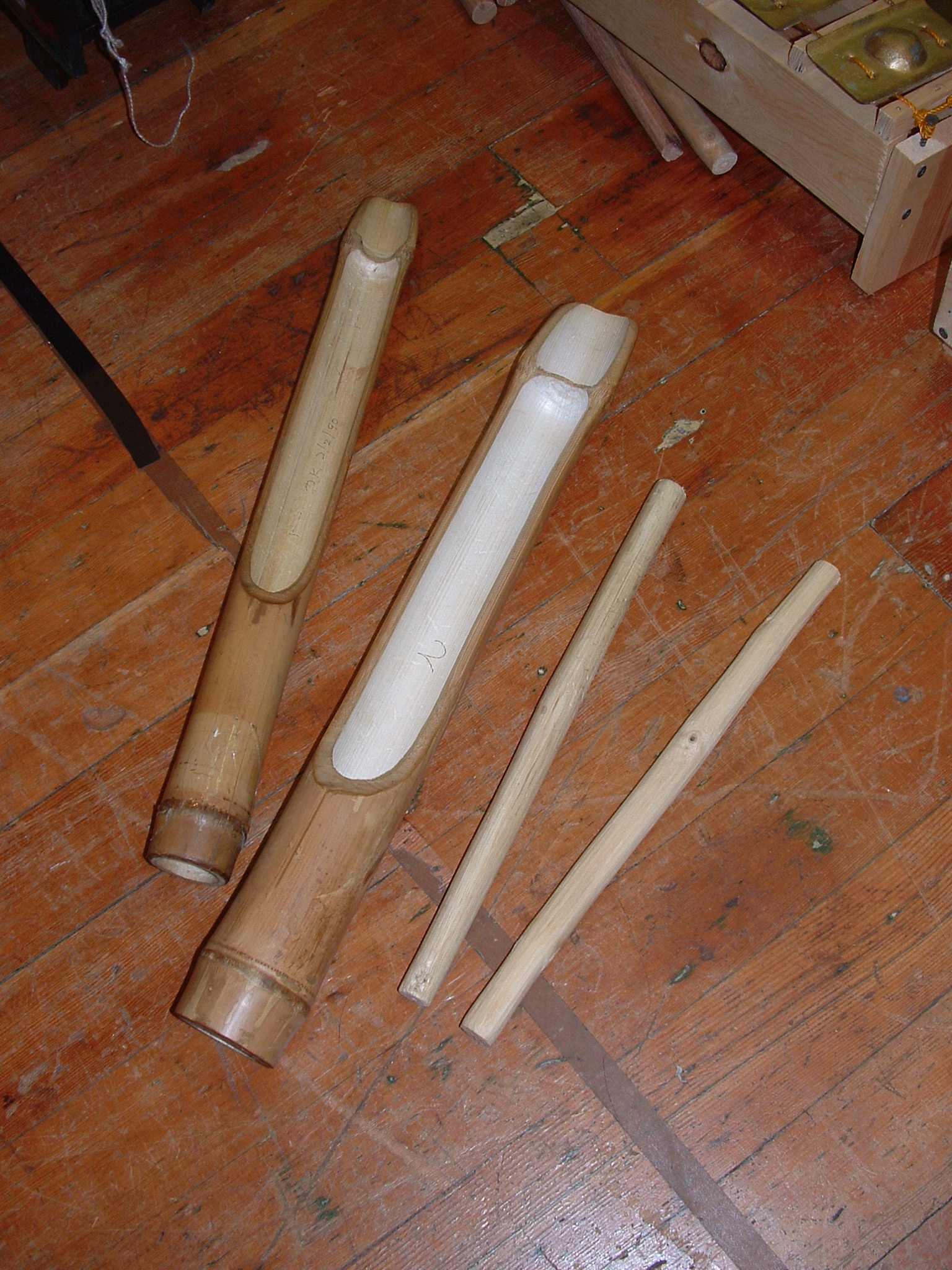

Percussion instrument
- Classification: Idiophone
- Hornbostel–Sachs classification: 111.24 (Percussion vessels - slit drum)
- Developed: Maguindanao

The agung a tamlang is a type of Philippine slit drum made of hollowed out bamboo in imitation of the real agung. Pitch is determined by the length and depth of the slit. It is used as practice for the real agung: players either use either one agung a tamlang (hold it with one hand and using the other to strike it with a beater) or using two agung a tamlangs where the other agung is held with one’s feet.
