= Dance culture in Nigeria =

Nigerian cultural dances

- Part of Nigeria
- Also known as: Different dance culture in Nigeria

Dance culture in Nigeria, also regarded as cultural dances, is among the varying cultures and traditions of Nigerians. Dance in Nigeria is a culture that unifies the people and also tells the people's stories. Dance culture is the way of expressing an idea, emotion or releasing energy. Cultural dance is a special type of dance that is shared by a community for specific uses and meanings. These include rituals, ceremonies like marriage and birth, paying respect to ancestors, or simply for enjoyment.

== Types of dance in Nigeria ==
There are different types of dance in Nigeria which includes:

1.The bata dance: This is the mostly danced amongst the Yoruba people of south western Nigeria. The bata dance can be performed as a part of festival or dance performance or used to dethrone or enthrone a king. It can also be said to be a cultural festival that serves as a means of entertaining people. Bata dance is an important part of entertainment because it encompasses different moves and stunts. It can be danced by both the males and the females in the Southwestern part of Nigeria, where it is popularly known. There are three main type of drums used during the bata dance, and these are what complete the Bata Dance festival, the name of these drums include; Iya-Ilu, Itotele, and Okokonlo.

2. Omuru-onwa and Agbacha-ekuru-nwa Dance: This also is an example of the types of dance in the Nigerian Dance Culture. It is strictly performed by married women, it generally involves responsive movement of the body, in a rhythmic fashion to hip-swinging. It is mainly used for entertainment, exercise, to lose weight, shed baby fats, and stay healthy through weekly rehearsals.

3. The Ekombi dance is mainly danced by Efik people of Calabar, Cross River State. It is a beautiful and entertaining dance in which maidens are dressed in multi-coloured attires sewn in a mini skirt and blouse form which exposes their stomach.

4. Atilogwu Dance : This is a traditional dance from the Igbo ethnic group of Nigeria. Atilogwu is one of the most entertaining Igbo dance that focuses on vigorous body movement and often includes acrobatics flips, high jumps and so on. It is mainly done by the youth that are capable and stronger.

== Importance of dance culture in Nigeria ==
Dance is one of the best art forms for expression, entertainment, fun and so on. It is a form of emotional expression, social interaction, or exercise and these dances are sometimes used to express ideas or tell a story. Dance is important to the human health and development of our young people in the society. Dance also helps develop skills that are necessary for learning such as; creativity, communication, critical thinking, and collaboration. Dance helps in providing multiple solutions to problem and play a vital role also in providing increase in the cognitive development of the society.
