= Steel tongue drum =

Type of round steel slit/tongue drum

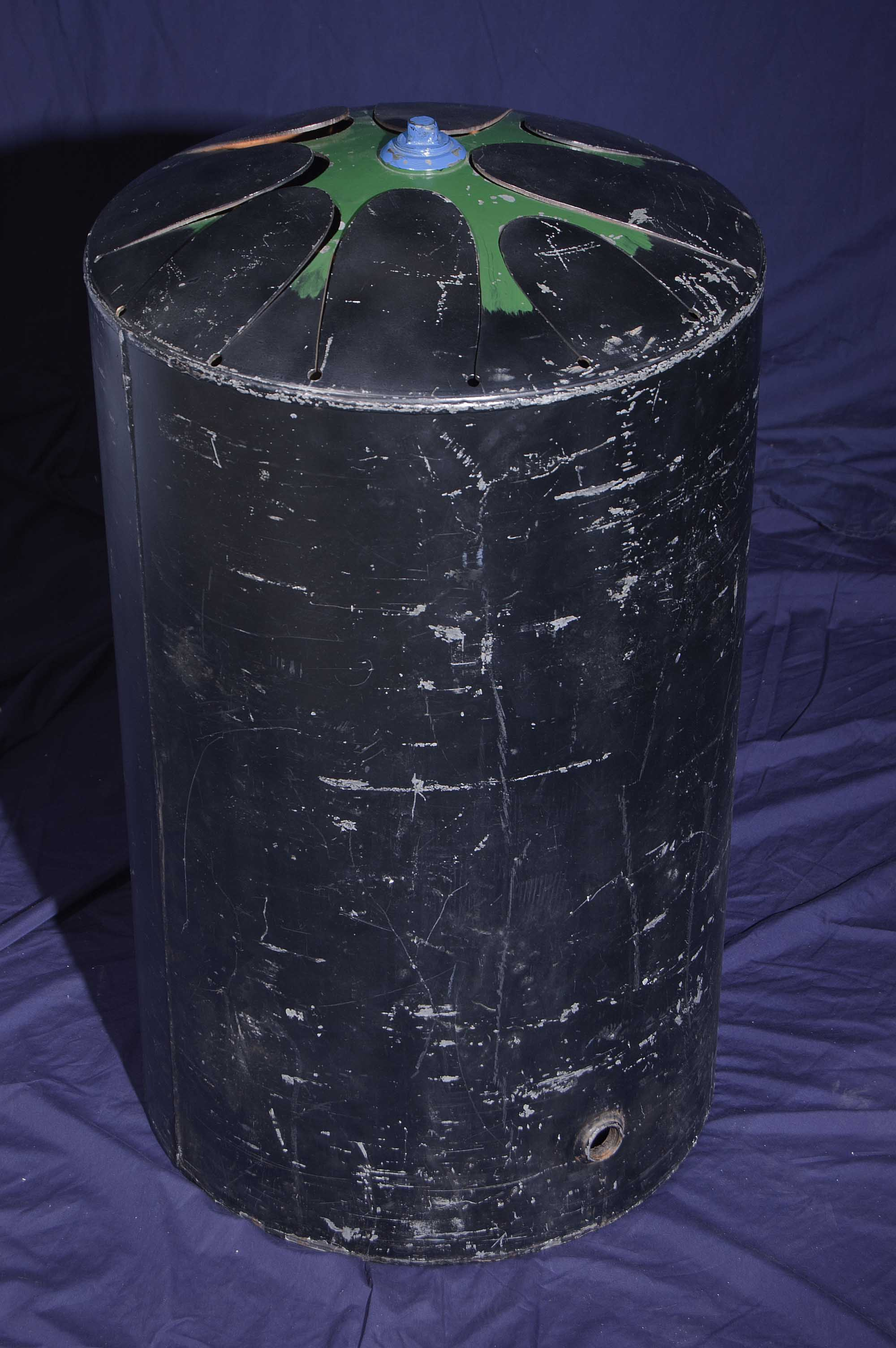
Whale drum

A steel tongue drum, tank drum, or hank drum is a round steel slit/tongue drum in the idiophone family originally fashioned from a propane cylinder.

== Description ==
A steel tongue drum can be made from an empty, often 20-lb (9-kg) propane tank. The tank is flipped over and the base is cut or knocked off. Seven to ten tongues are then cut radially into the bottom of the tank, forming the top of the instrument. A steel tongue drum can also be made from a new unused tank head. The tongues can be tuned by the maker by varying the length of the cuts, or by adding weights, often neodymium magnets, to the tongues. Although steel tongue drums are often tuned to pentatonic scales, they can also be tuned to the diatonic scale, the chromatic scale, or any set of notes the maker chooses. The instrument is played with the fingers or with mallets. It boasts a pleasant, bell-like tone.

Sound example

== History ==
The steel tongue drum is based on the wooden slit drum. The slit drum is known to have been developed independently by multiple ancient civilizations including Africans, Aztecs, and Indonesians. They were used for both ritual and entertainment in these ancient civilizations. The steel tongue drum of today had several predecessors, most notably the Whale Drum in 1990 by Jim Doble and the Tambiro by Felle Vega.

In February 2007, Dennis Havlena, inspired by the physical properties of the Tambiro and the tone layout of the Hang, created a steel tongue drum with a circular cross pattern layout from an empty 20-pound (9-kg) propane tank. The name 'Hank Drum' came from a combination of "Hang" and "tank".

Dennis Havlena's instrument, in turn, has inspired other steel tongue drum inventions. Today, a lot of vendors offer commercial versions of the steel tongue drum worldwide.

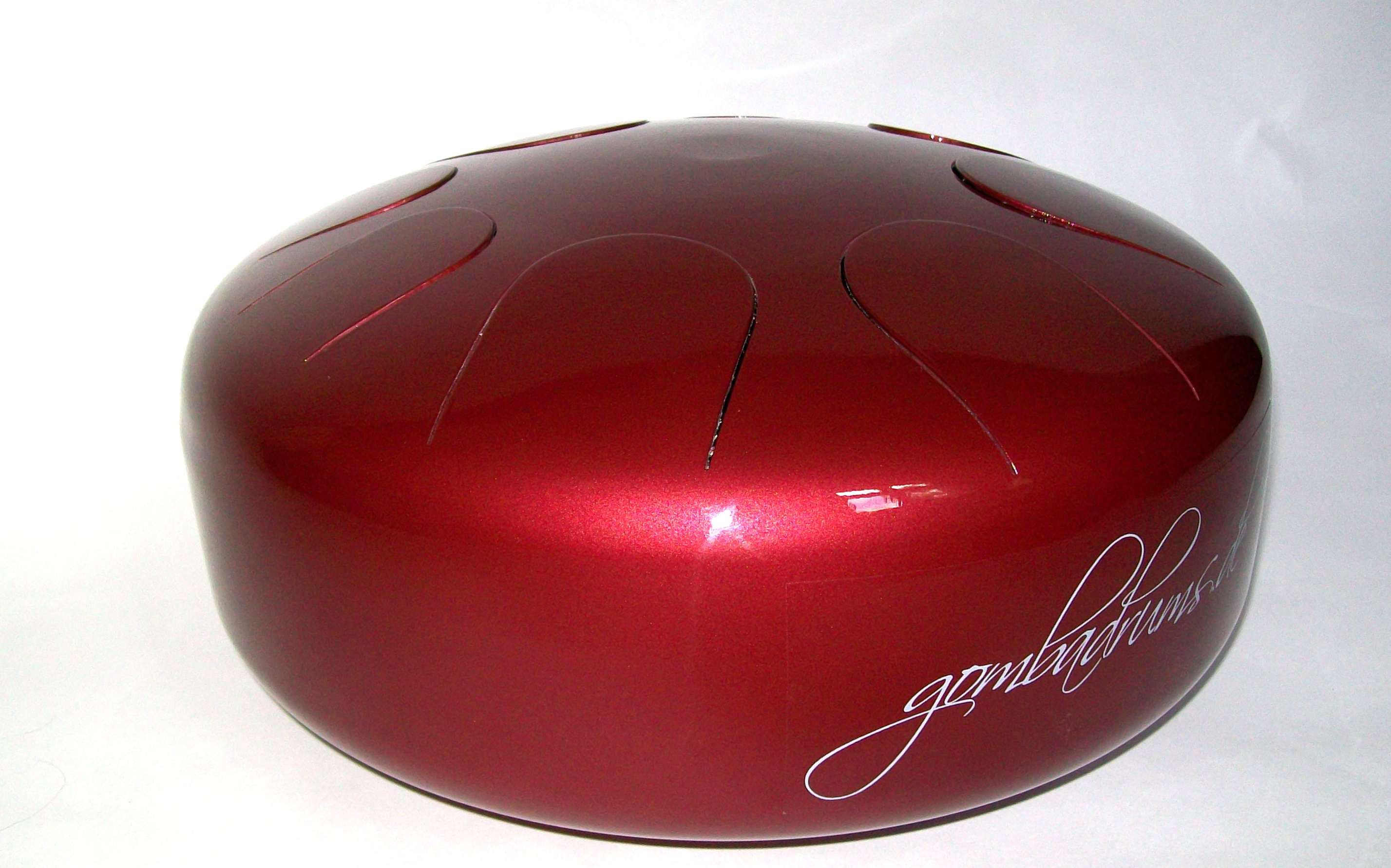
Hank drum

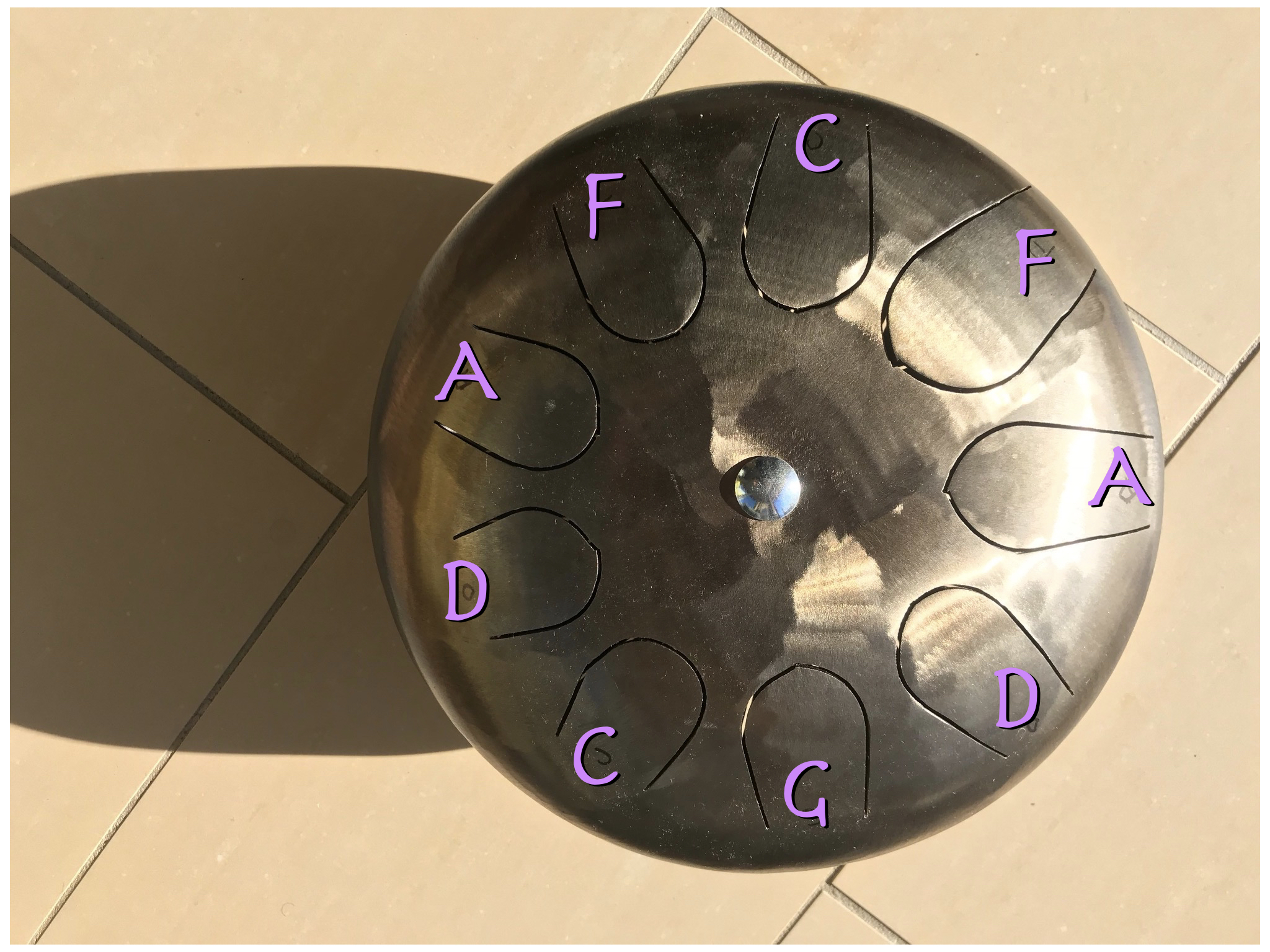
A steel tongue drum tuned in a pentatonic F scale with A 432 hz

== Construction ==
Slit drums were originally built out of hollowed out logs or bamboo, but the steel tank drum is made from steel and often built from 20-gallon (9-kg) propane tanks. The construction is usually enclosed, unlike other open-bottom drums, so the sound produced resonates through the steel and vibrating air escaped from the slits. When building from a propane tank, the paint is usually ground off first, and then slits of the right lengths are cut. The drum is tuned by filing away some of the metal, or by adding material through soldering or welding.

== See also ==
- Handpan
- Steelpan
