= Axatse =

West African percussion instrument

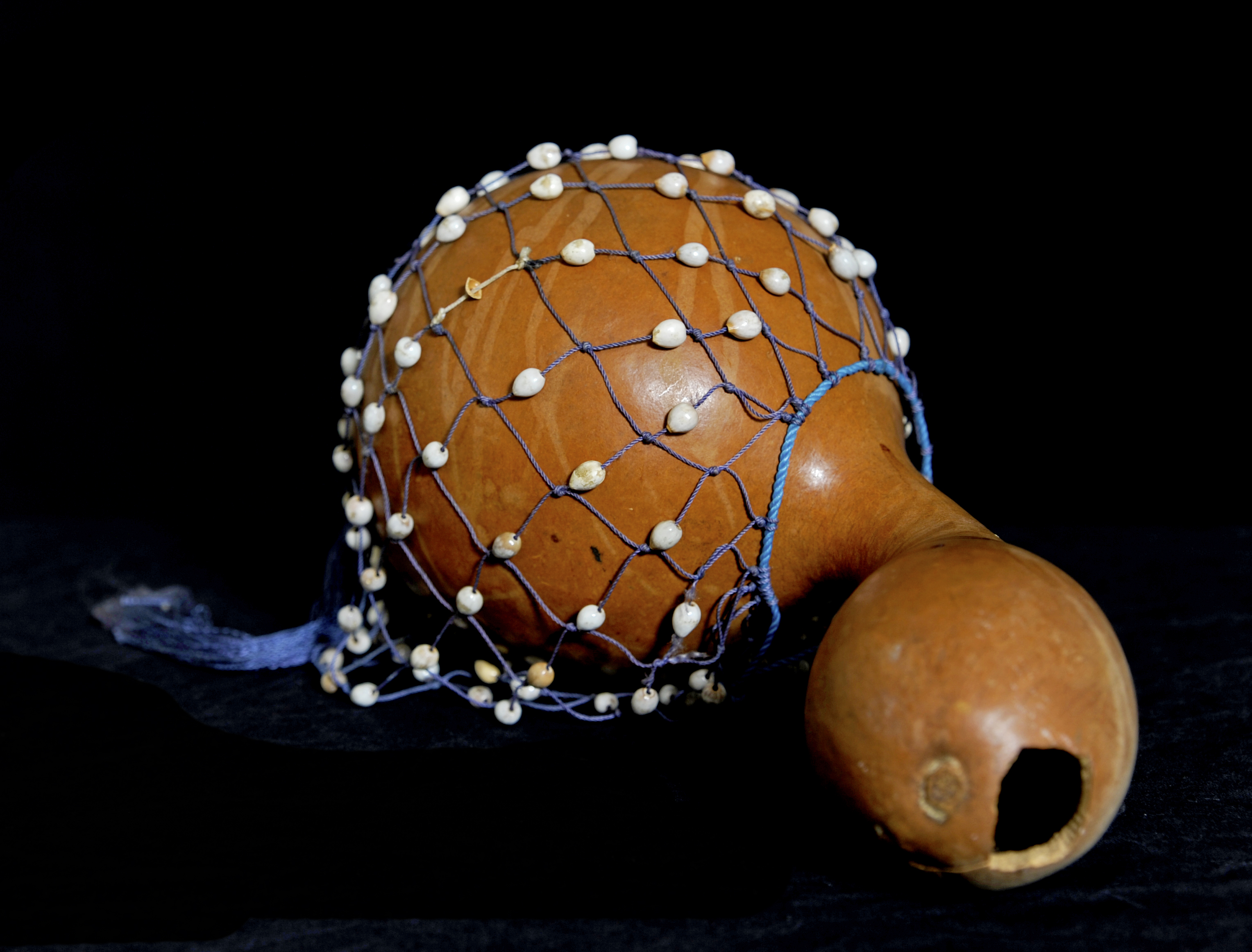

An axatse from Ghana
- Developed: West Africa

The axatse( /ˈɑː.hɑː.tʃeɪˌ/ or /ˈɑː.hɑː.tseɪˌ/) is a West African rattle-like percussion instrument. The axatse is a traditional musical instrument made from a dried gourd, wrapped in a beaded net. The axatse originated in Ghana and was used by the Ga ethnic group, Togo, and in the Volta Region by the Ewe people. The axatse is closely related to the shekere of the Yoruba people and the ichaka of the Igbo people of southern Nigeria, though the axatse is usually made from a smaller gourd. Axatse usually has a hole on the bottom of the gourd, while Shekere usually has a hole on the top of the gourd, near the stem. These holes are made to remove the seeds and the water from the gourd. This action of removing seeds adds resonance to the gourd and stops the gourd from rotting. The Axatse is traditionally percussed between the hands and the upper leg.

== Gallery ==
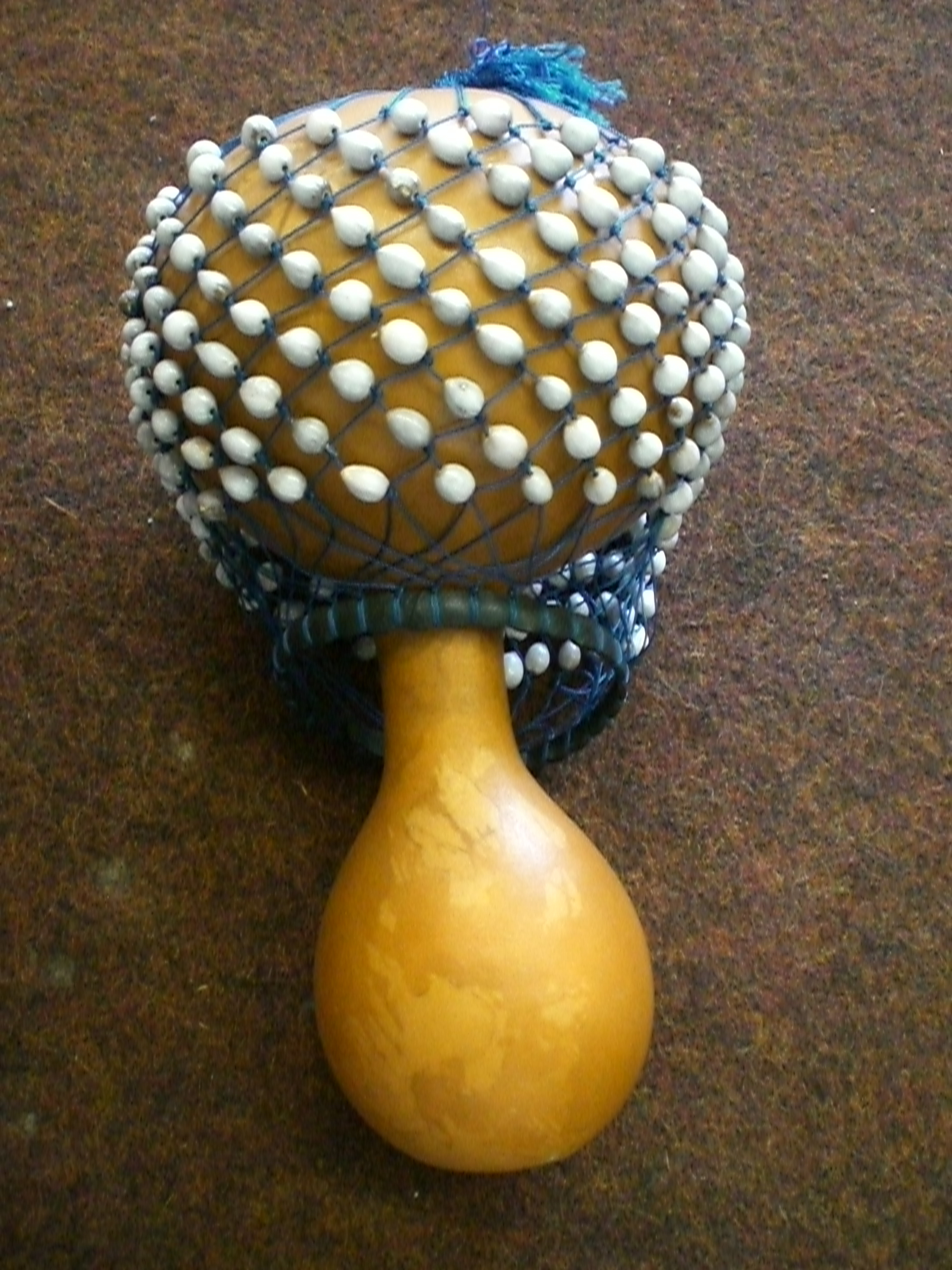
A traditional axatse
