= Maya music =

Music of the ancient Maya people

The music of the ancient Mayan courts is described throughout native and Spanish 16th-century texts and is depicted in the art of the Classic Period (200–900 AD). The Maya played instruments such as trumpets, flutes, whistles, and drums, and used music to accompany funerals, celebrations, and other rituals. Although no written music has survived, archaeologists have excavated musical instruments and painted and carved depictions of the ancient Maya that show how music was a complex element of societal and religious structure. Most of the music itself disappeared after the dissolution of the Maya courts following the Spanish Conquest. Some Mayan music has prevailed, however, and has been fused with Spanish influences.

== Instruments ==
Bonampak temple room 1, file of musicians: rattle and ocarina; trumpets; and theatrical scene

Important archaeological evidence of pre-Columbian Maya aerophones has been found in locations such as Tabasco, Campeche, and Jaina. Clay whistles were found in Jaina from burial sites. These whistles have mouthpieces in quadrangular, rectangular, ellipsoidal and conical shapes. Several whistles are shaped like human faces, and some are shaped like animals representing Mayan deities.

Aside from wind and percussive instruments there was not a wide variety of instruments used in classic Mayan music, as stringed instruments such as guitars were not invented in the region. Deceased rulers were often buried with musical instruments to help them pass through the underworld and to eventually be reborn.

=== Trumpets ===
There were several different types of Mayan trumpets. Some were made of clay and were relatively short, and wooden trumpets were much longer. A wall painting dating from c. 775 CE found at the Bonampak ceremonial complex in the dense jungles of Chiapas depicts twin trumpeters standing side by side in a 12-man orchestra. This, and other artistic depictions of Mayan trumpeters depict the lips of the players being held very tightly over the mouthpiece, suggesting that the wooden trumpets were used to blow higher overtones. While the use of clay trumpets gradually diminished, the use of wooden trumpets persisted. "Long thin trumpets of hollow wood with long twisted gourds at the ends" still existed by the time Diego de Landa wrote his Relación in 1566.

=== Flutes ===
The Maya used many different types of flutes, some much like modern flutes and others very different. A common type of Mayan flute had a goitre chamber on the side which was used to deflect the air going into the instrument from taking a straight path. This caused the instrument to produce a sound more closely resembling that of an oboe. Another type of flute used was a tube flute which was capable of producing 3 note chords, a role not commonly fulfilled by wind instruments. The Maya also played the Ocarina, a small, whistle-sized Vessel flute. Depending on their construction, ocarinas were capable of producing five different pitches by way of four or five holes in the instrument. Certain studies and excavation reports of ancient Maya sites speculate that ocarinas were played during small cult rituals and burial ceremonies. Larger flutes were capable of producing more pitches. The Dresden Codex, a book that dates to the thirteenth or fourteenth century which contains 78 pages of ancient Maya hieroglyphs, depicts images of people playing drums and flutes. Template 34 of the Dresden Codex depicts the flute as an instrument associated with a fertility or thanksgiving ritual.

=== Percussion ===
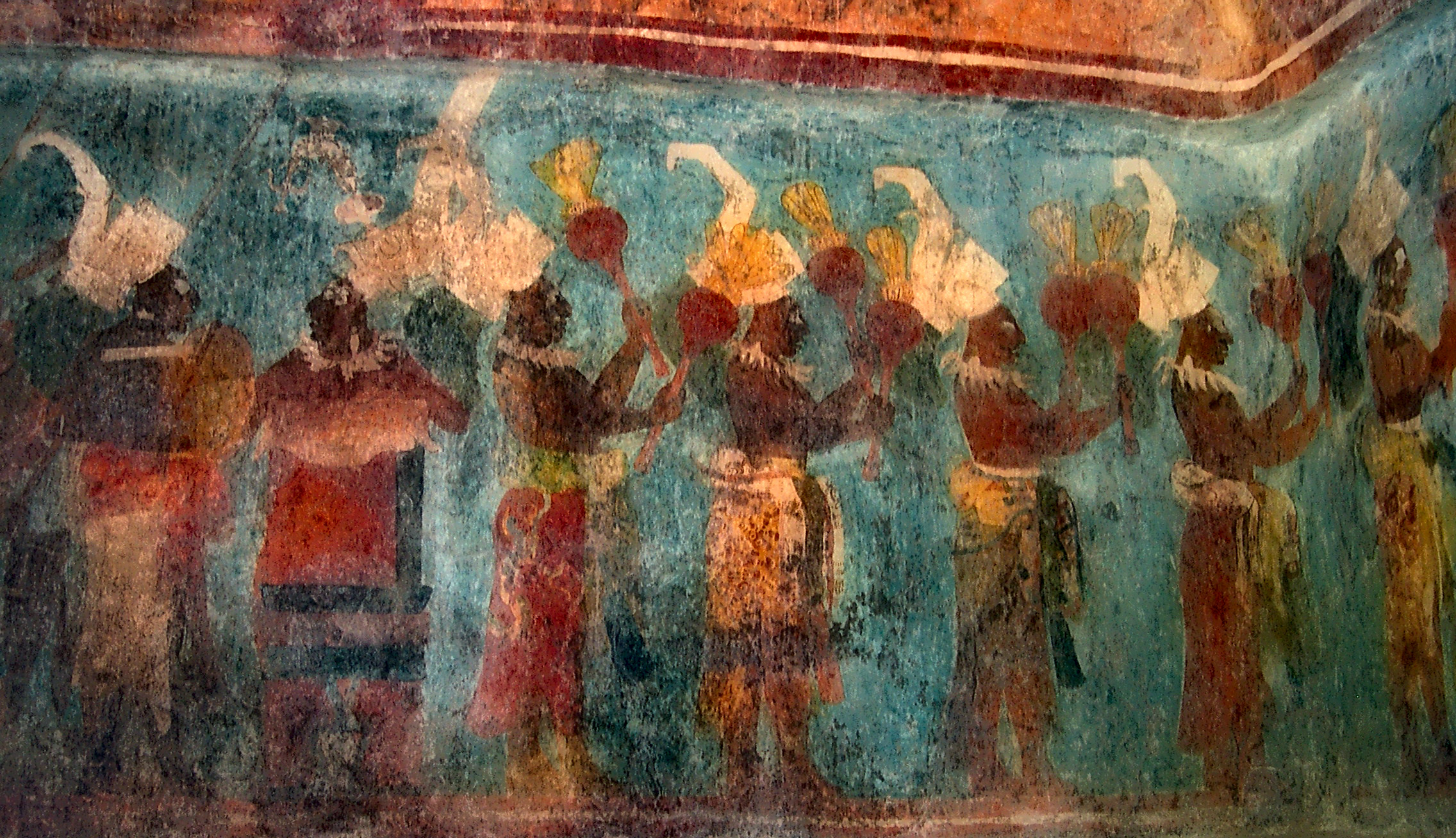
Bonampak temple room 1, file of musicians: portable turtle drum, standing drum, and maracas

Mayan percussion commonly consisted of drums and rattles. Two of the three surviving pre-Columbian Mayan manuscripts in European libraries discuss the kayum, an upright single-headed cylindrical or kettle-shaped drum, played barehanded. The top and bottom panels in side 63 (34) of the Dresden Manuscript depict deities playing drums whose clay frames look like two arms of a candelabra. The arms are covered by a tied hide, and the base joining the two arms is filled with water, enabling the player to adjust the pitch of the drum. The Dresden Manuscript also shows an image of a deity shaking a large perforated rattle and another playing an end-blown flute. Glyphs that represent musical sound from both the drum and flute.

Large vertical drums (which the Aztecs called huehuetl) were made of wood and did not survive. The much lower standing kettle drums that have been found - often shaped like a bulbous jar on a pedestal, single or double - are earthenware. In depictions, the membrane is sometimes shown to consist of a jaguar pelt. In the Late-Postclassic Dresden Codex (34a), the drum connects to an open resonance chamber without membrane. Another type of kettle drum was portable and held under the arm. The horizontal slit-drums (tun, Aztec teponaztli) appear only after the close of the Classic Period, probably under Toltec influence. In addition there were tortoiseshell and turtleshell drums played with the hand (Herrera), or with a stick such as a deer antler. Metal instruments generally had no place in Classic Mayan music. The exception to this were pellet-bell rattles, which represented the god of death. The hundred golden pellet-bell rattles found in 1926 at the Sacred Well at Chichen-Itza were brought to the site from afar. The Dresden and Madrid manuscripts depict gods ornamented with jingles.

== Performance and religious significance ==
Theatrical events, dance, ritual, and, to a lesser extent, even warfare would have been unthinkable without musical support. Therefore, the musical director in Yucatán, the holpop, was held in high esteem. Maya dictionaries, both ancient and more recent, contain many words and distinctions related to music, such as, for example, Chʼortiʼ lahb "stroke [a drum] with the dexterity of a tortilla maker."

The 16th-century Quiché-Maya hero myth of the Popol Vuh stages the brothers Hun-Batz and Hun-Choven as flautists and singers, while describing them as patrons of the other arts as well; the Hero Twins transform them into monkeys by playing the flute and the drum and by singing a certain tune. The musical Elder Brethren correspond to the Howler Monkey Gods of the Classic period. In the Classic and Late-Preclassic Periods, the Tonsured Maize God - another deity of the arts - is intimately connected to a small, portable turtle drum; the deity of the day Ik' (Wind) is sometimes shown as a musician shaking rattles. Particularly the drums, whether the slit-drum, the kettle drum, or the high wooden drum, appear with specific rhythmical motifs to have initiated the musical performances, or, as Gerónimo de Mendieta states in writing about the native music of New Spain, "when the dancers hear that the kettle drums [atabales] start, they understand by their tone the song and the dance, and then start it."

According to Cogolludo, the holpop was not only "the principal singer who sets the key and teaches what is necessary to sing," but also the keeper of the musical instruments, first of all the [horizontal] tunkul drums. In the Rabinal Achí, a Highland Maya 'tun-dance' drama dating back to the 16th century, the stage and music director is usually the one who plays the ancient wooden slit-drum (tun), accompanied by two trumpets. The most complete depiction of a Classical period musical performance is that on the lower walls of a Bonampak temple room (room 1). Dating back to AD 791, it shows a royal dance accompanied by a file of twelve musicians divided into sections: pairs of large rattles (5 players) - a high, vertical drum (1 player) - large, portable turtle/tortoise drums played with sticks (3 players) - long trumpets (2 players) - rattle and ocarina (1 player). In between the turtle drums and the trumpets is a group of five theatrical impersonators surrounding a young noblewoman. The trumpets may have started, with the standing drum then assuming the lead part. Among the Maya, group dances were considered highly sacred. According to Bishop Diego de Landa groups of men and women danced separately and had particular musical ceremonies in which they specialized. De Landa described a dance in which two men led the steps. One hurled reeds at the other man for him to catch, while they both performed complicated dance steps. Landa also witnessed a sacred war dance, in which as many as 800 men carrying small banners followed a complex pattern of steps in perfect unison. Some of the earliest known Mayan dances were associated with shamanistic rituals and altered states of conscious. Dance may have been a way of giving sacred beings life and voice through the dancer's movement and song. Combined with music and the fragrance of burning offerings, dance was often regarded as the direct manifestation of supernatural forces.

== Mayan music today ==
Indigenous Mayan music can still be heard today in Yucatán and Chiapas. The tunkul (a slit drum) and the bulalek (water drum) are played in Yucatán during Christian religious festivities. The Tzotzil and Tzèltal are groups of indigenous people located in the highlands of Chiapas who have retained a great variety of traditional Mayan dances, accompanied by a combination of indigenous instruments and European instruments. One dance includes the danza del agua, (water dance) of San Juan Chamula, accompanied by a double-headed cylindrical drum and a 12-string guitar. This dance is performed at Catholic ceremonies. Other dances of this region include the yojualelvinajil, accompanied by a harp and 12-string guitar, and the quintajimoltic, a carnival dance accompanied by a single-headed drum and a cane flute. The drum is made out of a clay pot with a single skin head covering the mouth of the pot. A regional music known as jarana is played today in Yucatán. Jarana has strong European roots, emphasized by the presence of brass bands and Hemiola rhythms. Jaranas are danced to in order to honor patron saints at Christian festivities, and are still performed at certain Maya rituals in honor of ancient Mayan deities, such as Chaac, the Mayan god of rain. Christian practices have been integrated into Mayan rituals. Another style of music is called son de maya pax, played in Quintana Roo, accompanied by violins, cornets, snare drums and bass drums. In the Guatemalan highlands, the Colonial and post-Colonial music of the Spanish has fused with indigenous Maya music. This syncretic music is used to accompany dance plays, and Maya communal performance events involving dance, theatre, and music. There are several types of highland Guatemalan dance plays, and each play is characterized by a theme (i.e. conquest, hunting, and sacrifice.) Today these performance events are called bailes and they are performed at a town's central church during festivals honoring saints. One of these dances is the Kʼicheʼ Warrior Dance, dating back to the Postclassic era. This dance was accompanied by flutes and drums and was a pre-battle music and dance ceremony. It is thought that flutes, drums, and shells were sounded during battles in the Guatemalan highlands. Other dances include the deer dance, Baile del Venado which pairs an indigenous hunting theme with Western musical instruments such as the marimba.

== See also ==
- Aztec music
- Maori music
