= Maroon music =

Maroon Music is a genre involving people of African descent that were not born on the continent creating songs in an African language (as opposed to their first language). It is named after the Maroon (people), African refugees who escaped from slavery in the Americas and formed independent settlements. Just as the Maroon people created their own societies in lands foreign to them in attempts to retain their freedom, Maroon music is an attempt by African American artists to reacquire their Mother tongue through writing music in an indigenous African language. Maroon Music subject matter centers around stories about Maroon leaders and other historic freedom fighters of African descent, Maroon groups, peace, unity, and righteousness.

In the intro to Maroon music artist, Adetokunbo's first album "Maroon Music" the history of the genre is explained:

"African refugees that escaped slavery in the Americas and formed independent settlements were called Maroons. The term can also be applied to their descendants. The same root word also gives us the English verb "to maroon".

When runaway slaves banded together and subsisted independently they were called Maroons. On the Caribbean islands, runaway slaves formed bands and on some islands formed armed camps. Maroon communities faced great odds to survive against oppressive attackers, obtain food for subsistence living, and to reproduce and increase their numbers. There is much variety among Maroon cultural groups because of differences in history, geography, African nationality, and the culture of indigenous people throughout the Western hemisphere.

Maroon settlements sometimes developed creole languages by mixing European tongues with their original African languages. Other times the Maroons would adopt the local European language as a common tongue, for members of the community frequently spoke a variety of Mother Tongues.

What you are about to hear is a family's journey to reacquire their Mother Tongue through song. Their goal is to reacquire that which was lost in the Middle Passage. Let this music, Maroon Music, serve as their testament to freedom in a world that has nothing but contempt for the self liberated."

Maroon music is less concerned with the perfection and fluency of speech of the African language but more with the exercise of learning and improving communication, while providing subtitles and written keys in English so that others will understand the message attempting to be conveyed by the artist. As pidgin English is noted as "is a simplified version of a language that develops as a means of communication between two or more groups that do not have a language in common Pidgin, Maroon music employs the pidginization or Creolization of African languages as a simplified means for African Americans to communicate with indigenous Africans. For this reason, key's and subtitles in Maroon Music videos are an essential component for conveying intended meaning to both indigenous Africans and those born abroad.

The Maroons are a number of diverse peoples in the Caribbean, South America, North America and Central America, the descendants of escaped slaves. The Seminole music tradition of the United States is an example, as are numerous communities in Jamaica, Suriname and French Guiana.

The Surinamese escaped slaves managed to hide in the dense jungles of the area, and formed communities like the Aluku, Saramaka and Ndjuka. Their traditional sung stories are called mato, and there is also a kind of popular Maroon music called aleke. Traditional dances include awasa, a women's social dance.

The Jamaican Maroons are known for instruments like the abeng, a kind of horn.
