= Slit drum =

Hollow percussion idiophone instrument

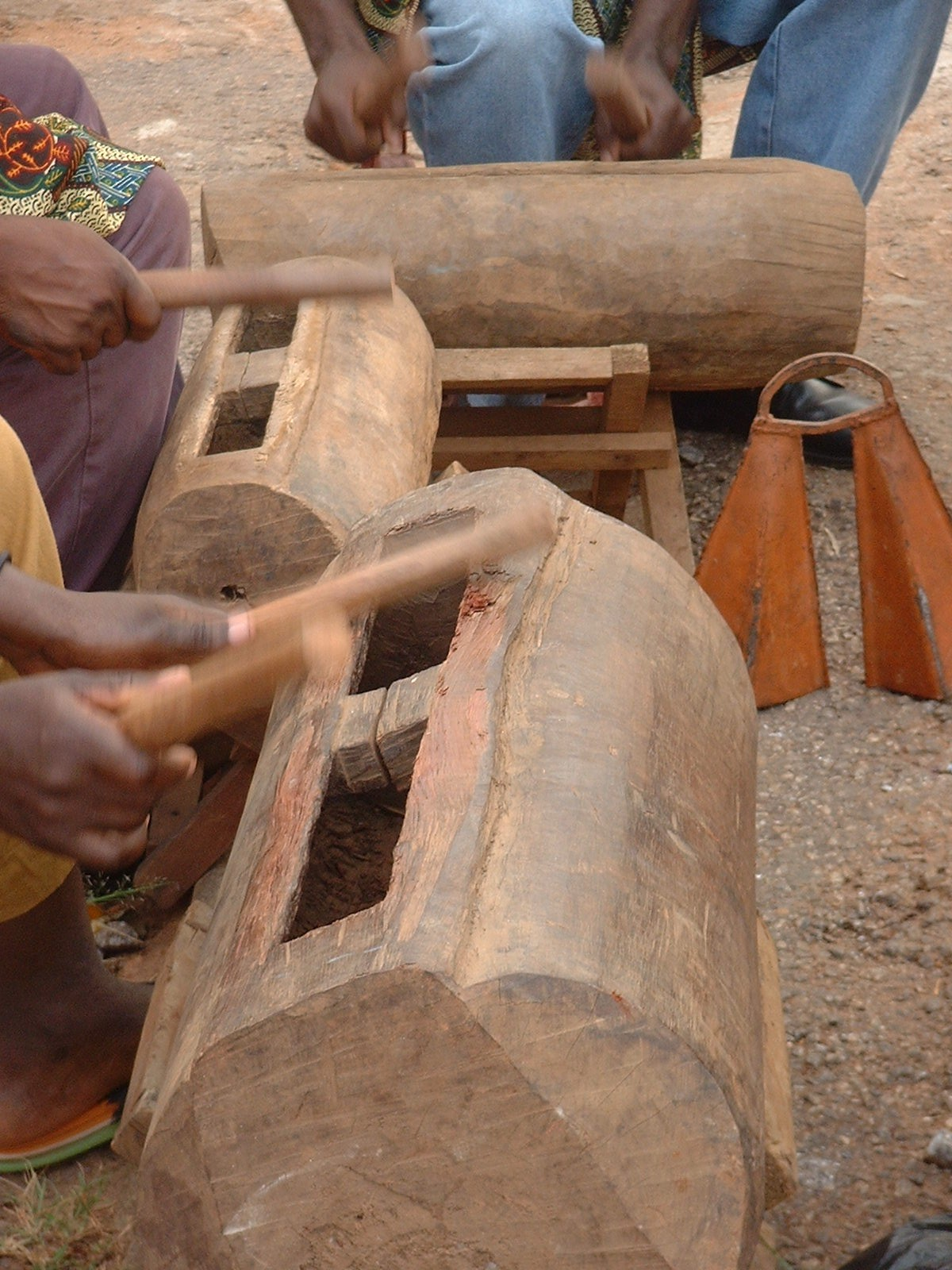
Bamileke drummers in Cameroon's West Province.

A slit drum, or slit gong, is a hollow percussion instrument, often made out of wood or bamboo. In spite of its often being called a drum, it is not a true drum, because it lacks a drumhead, the membrane (made out of animal skin or plastic) stretched across the top of a true drum. It is classed instead as an idiophone in which the entire instrument vibrates.

== Description ==
A slit drum is usually carved or constructed from bamboo or wood, in the form of a mostly closed hollow chamber with one or more slits in it. It is played by striking near the edge of the slit. In some designs, the slit is a single straight line; in others, the slit is used to create one or more "tongues", achieved by cutting three sides of a rectangular (or similar) shape and leaving the fourth side attached. Most slit drums have one slit, though two and three slits (often resembling an "H" and thereby forming two tongues) occur. Tongues of different areas or thicknesses will produce different pitches. Slit drums are used throughout Africa, Southeast Asia, and Oceania. In Africa, such drums are situated in strategic locations for optimal acoustic transmission (e.g., along a river or valley), in order to be used for long-distance communication.

The ends of a slit drum are closed so that the shell becomes the resonating chamber for the sound vibrations created when the tongues are struck, usually with a stick or mallet. The resonating chamber increases the volume of the sound produced by the tongue and presents the sound through an open port. If the resonating chamber is the correct size for the pitch being produced by the tongue, which means it has the correct volume of airspace to complete one full sound wave for that particular pitch, the instrument will be more efficient and louder.

The people of Vanuatu create a similar instrument out of a large log. In most islands, the drum lies horizontally on the ground. In the central islands, slit drums are erected vertically, and adorned with carvings on the outer surface, representing spirits. While traditional on one island only, this adorned type of drums have become one of the national emblems of Vanuatu as a whole.

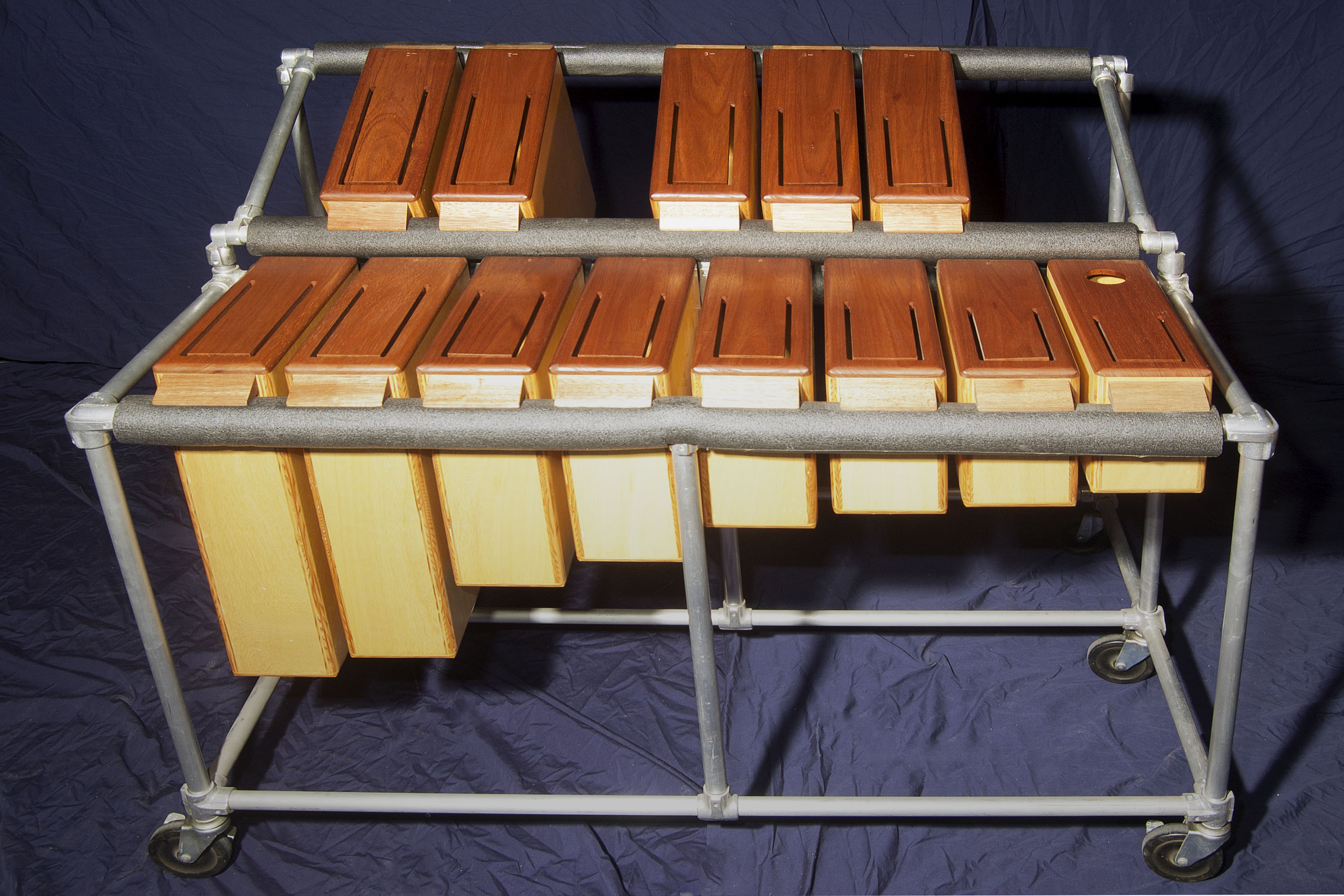
Chromatically tuned slit drums, range C3–C4

== List of slit drums ==
=== African ===
- Enók - Manyu Division (Cameroon)
- Alimba – Zairean (Democratic Republic of the Congo)
- Ekwe – Igbo (Nigeria, Equatorial Guinea)
- Ikoro – Igbo (Nigeria, Equatorial Guinea)
- Krin or Kolokolos – Guinea
- Lokole – Congo Basin
- Lukombé – (Democratic Republic of the Congo)
- Mondo – West Africa
- Mukoku – Yaka people (Congo)
- Sudanese slit drum – Sudanese (Sudan)

=== Austroasiatic ===
- Grōg (木鼓, 克罗克, 库洛, 克拉) – Wa (China and Myanmar)

=== Austronesian ===
- Agung a Tamlang — Maguindanaon (Philippines)
- Atingting kon — Ambrym (Vanuatu)
- Garamut — Papuan and especially Tolai people (Papua New Guinea)
- Kagul — Maguindanaon (Philippines)
- Kalatong — Tagalog (Philippines)
- Kohkol — Sundanese (Indonesia)
- Kentongan — Javanese (Indonesia), used to wake people for sahur meals on Ramadan
- Kulkul — Balinese (Indonesia)
- Lali — Fijian (Fiji)
- Pahu — Māori (Aotearoa / New Zealand)
- Pate — Samoa, Cook Islands, and other parts of Polynesia
- Tagutok (Philippine) — Maranao (Philippines)
- Tōʻere — Tahitian (Tahiti), also Tōkere by Tuamotuans, Mangarevans and Cook Islanders

=== Mesoamerican ===
- Huiringua – Mexico
- Mayohuacán – Taino people (Puerto Rico, Cuba, Dominican Republic, Caribbean)
- Teponaztli – Mesoamerican

=== Modern ===
- Gato – 20th-century American, originally a brand name, later generic
- Tongue drum

=== Sinitic ===
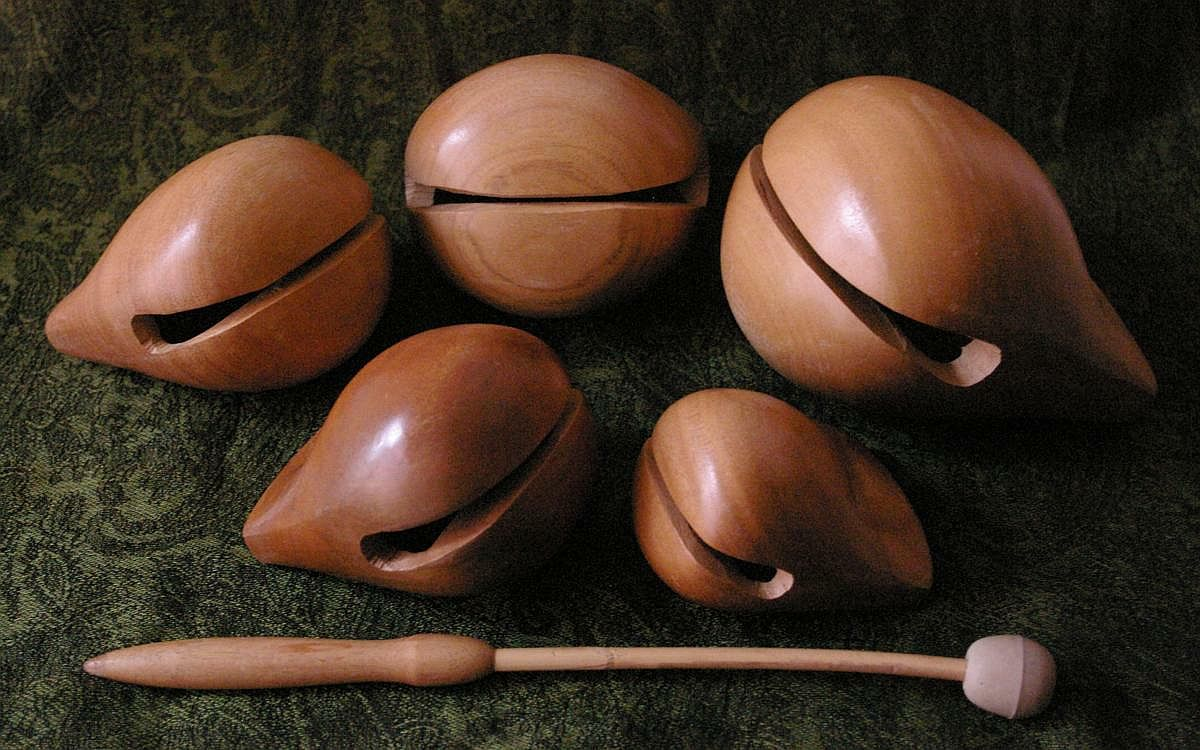
Wooden fish

The wooden fish works like a slit drum but is rarely classified with the other slit drums.

== Gallery ==
Slit drums from different cultures
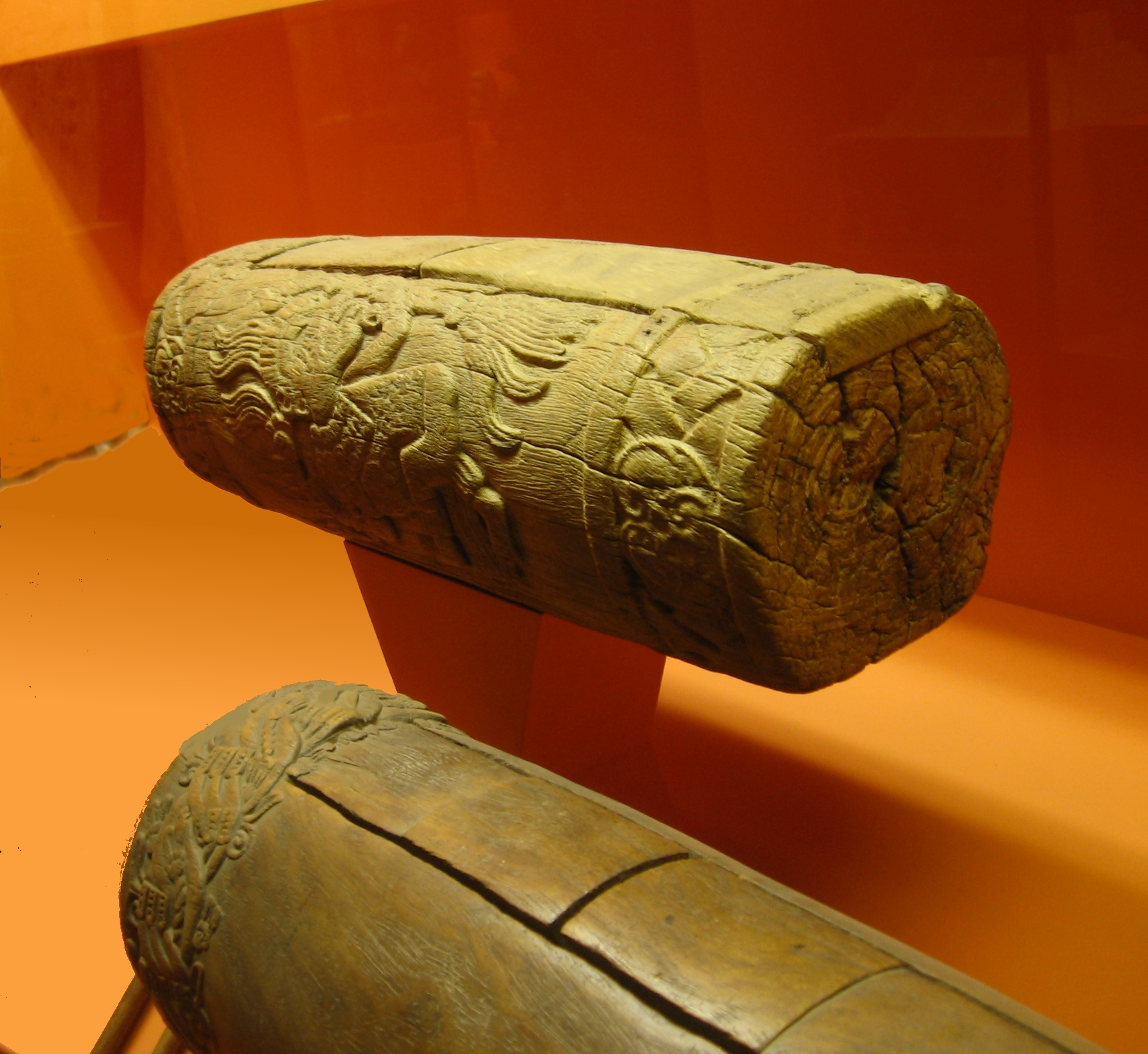
Two Aztec slit drums, called teponaztli. The characteristic "H" slits can be seen on the top of the drum in the foreground.

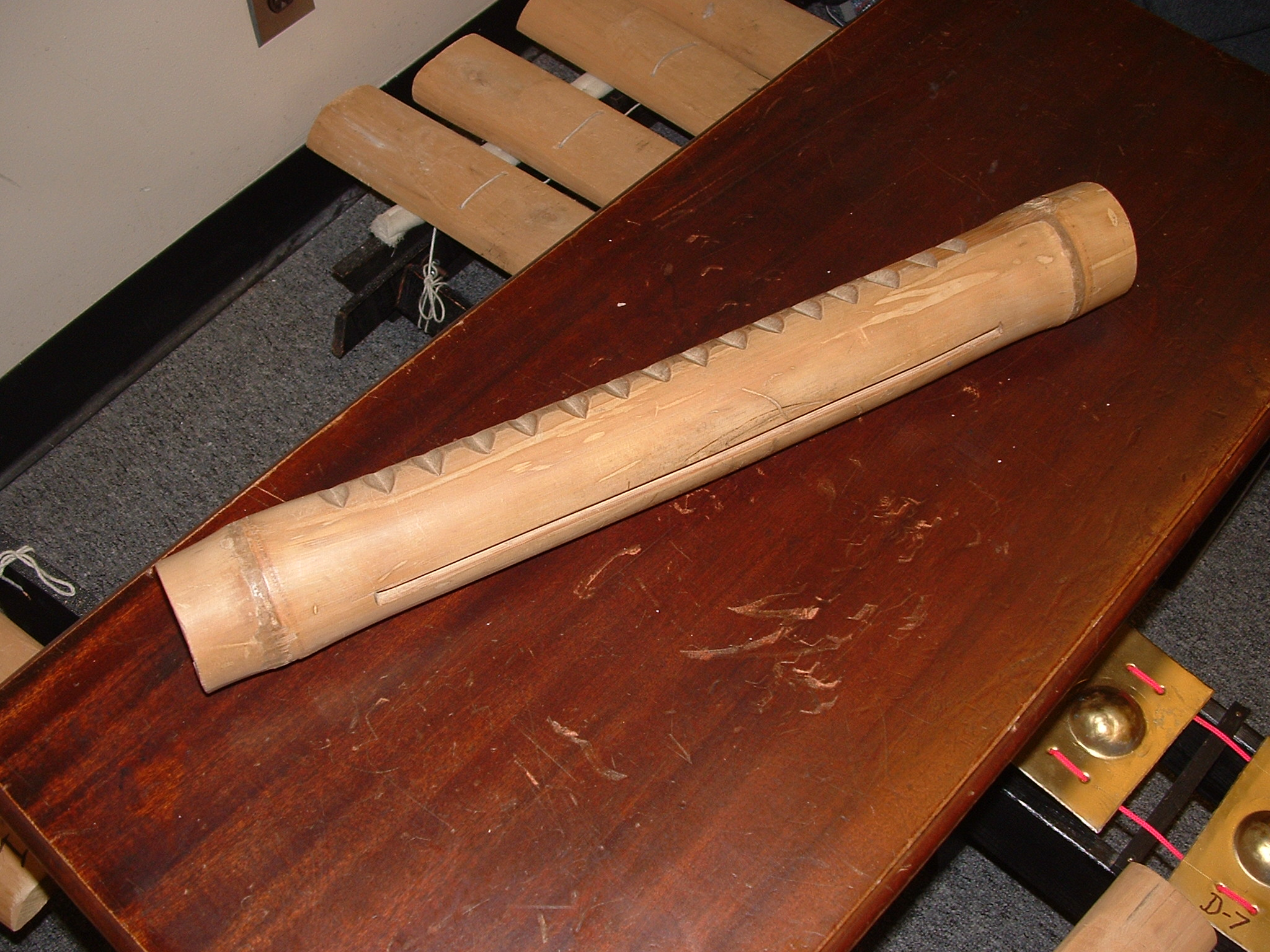
An example of a slit drum from the Philippines known as a kagul by the Maguindanaon people

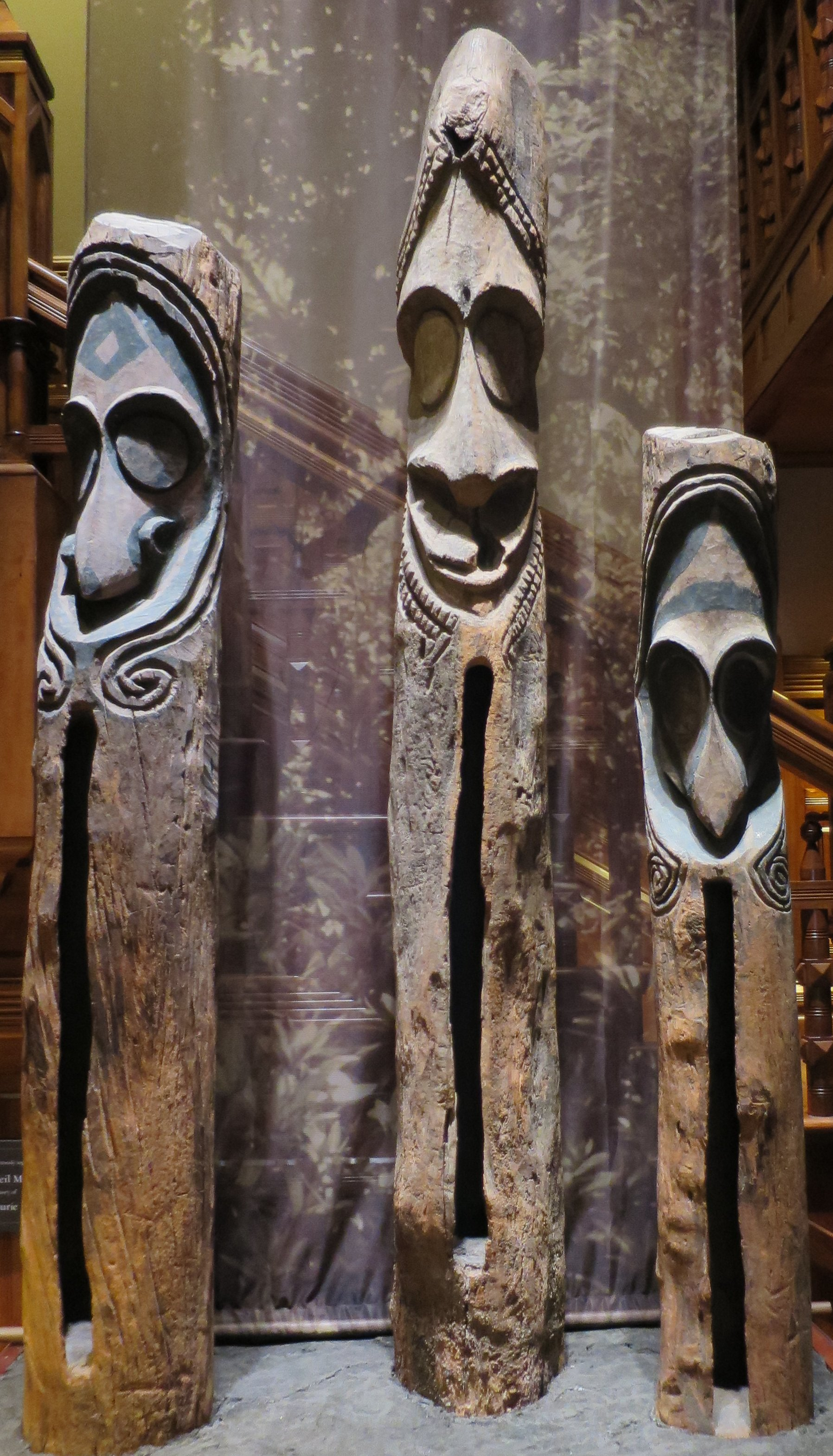
Wooden slit drums from Vanuatu (Bernice P. Bishop Museum)

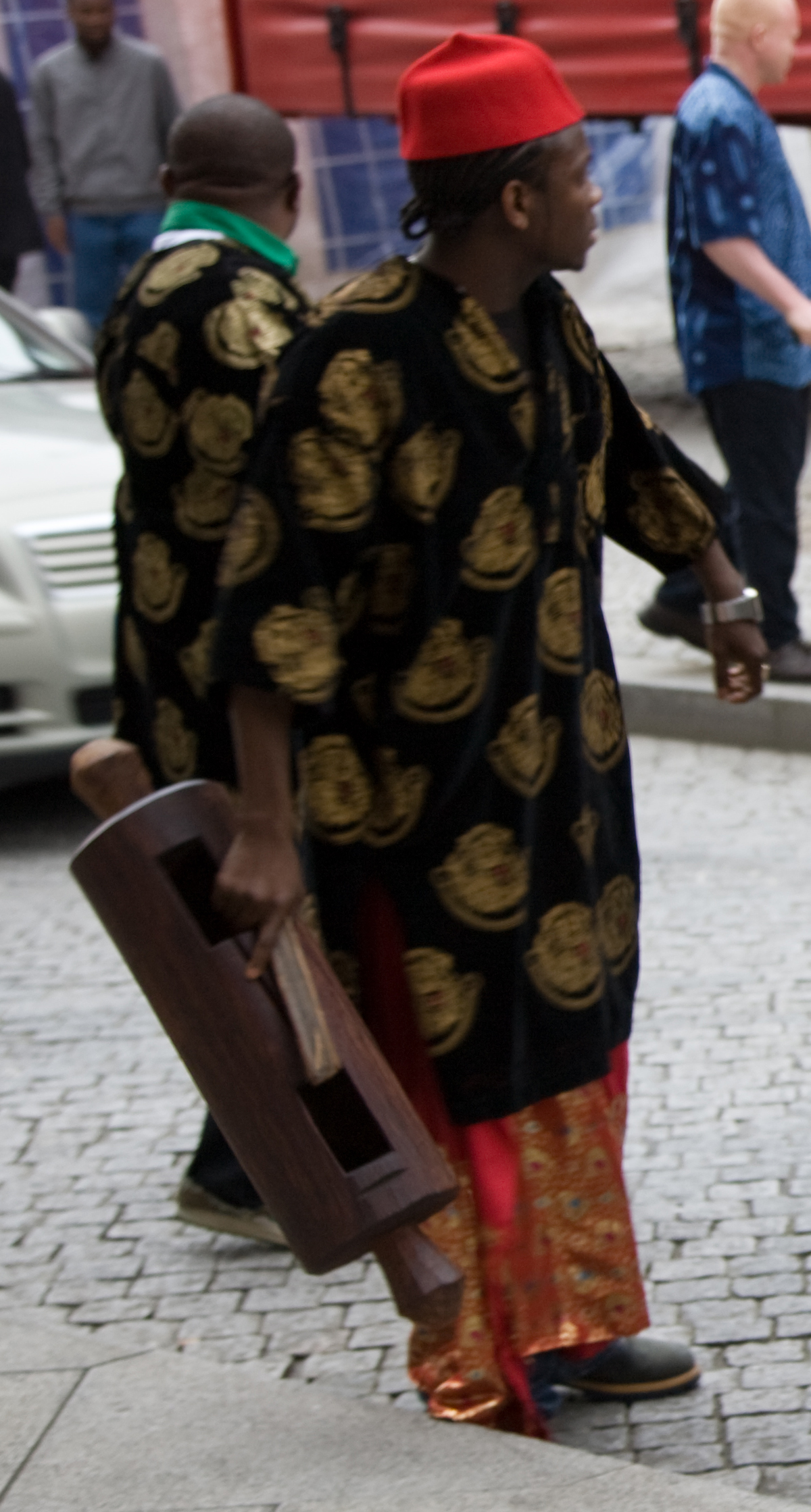
Ekwe drum of the Igbo people

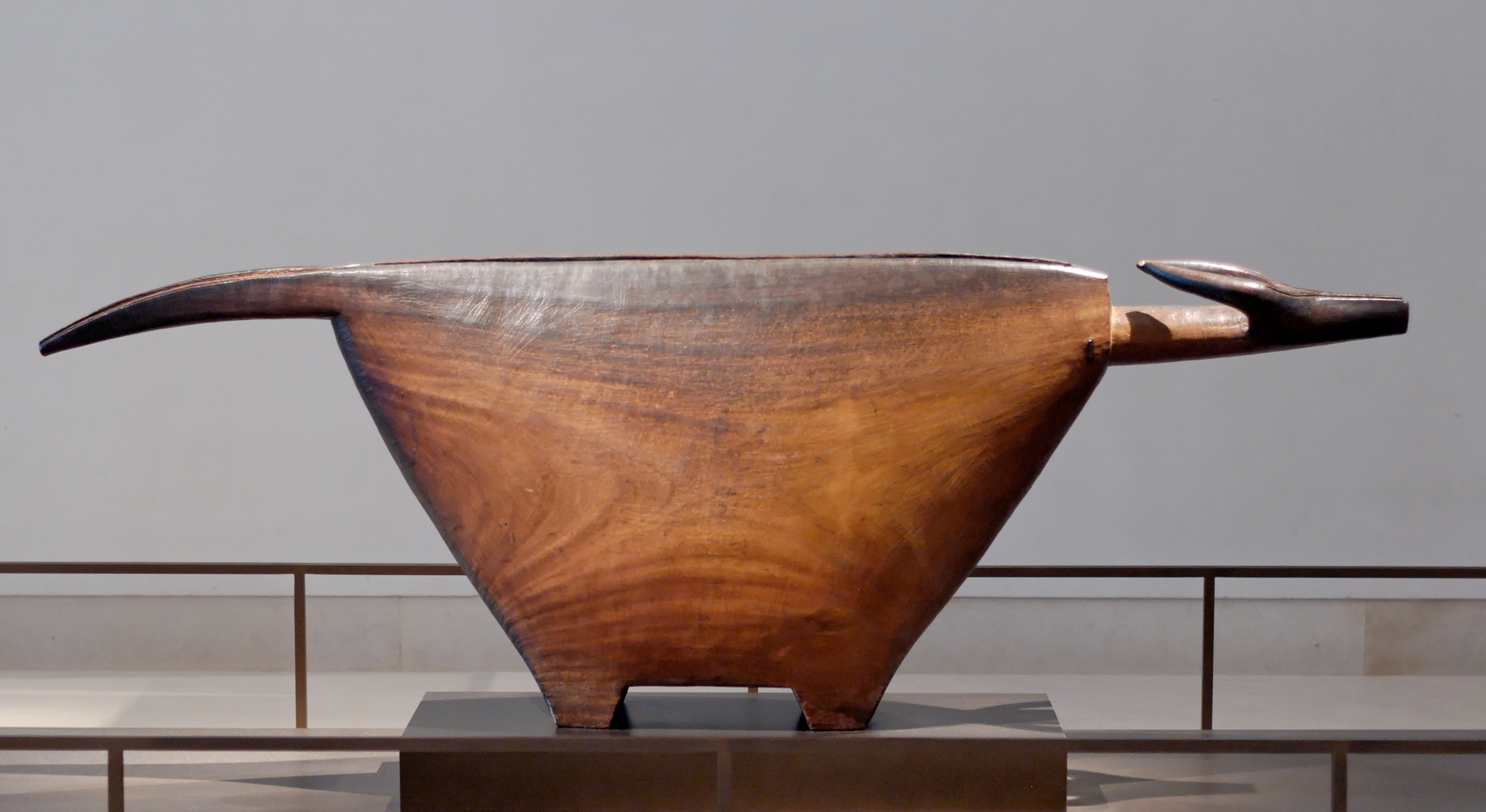
Banda-Yangere animal-shaped slit drum

== See also ==
- Bamboo musical instruments
- Drums in communication
- Tank drum
- Wood block
