= Mayohuacán =

Taíno slit drum

Percussion instrument
- Other names: Bayohabao
- Classification: Percussion
- Hornbostel–Sachs classification: 111.231 (Directly struck idiophone, individual percussion tube)
- Developed: c. 15th century
- Volume: High

Related instruments
- Teponaztli

The mayohuacán or bayohabao (Note: Various spellings exist based early accounts of the instrument and later interpretations, e.g. Ulloa: maiohauau; Pané, mayohabao; Martyr, maguey.) was a wooden slit drum played by the Indigenous Taíno people of the Caribbean. The instrument was played during sacred ceremonies, most notably the areíto. The drum was made of a thin wood and was shaped like an elongated gourd that measured up to one metre long and half a metre wide. According to early accounts of the taíno such as Gonzalo Fernández de Oviedo y Valdés' La historia general y natural de las Indias (1526), the sound produced by the mayohuacán could be heard as far as a "league and a half away" (a league being a distance between 5.3 and 7.9 miles, or 8.0 and 11.2 km). These were played by leaders of the tribe as accompaniment to songs which were used to pass on customs and laws to younger generations.

== See also ==
- Teponaztli
