= Ekwe =

Igbo musical instrument

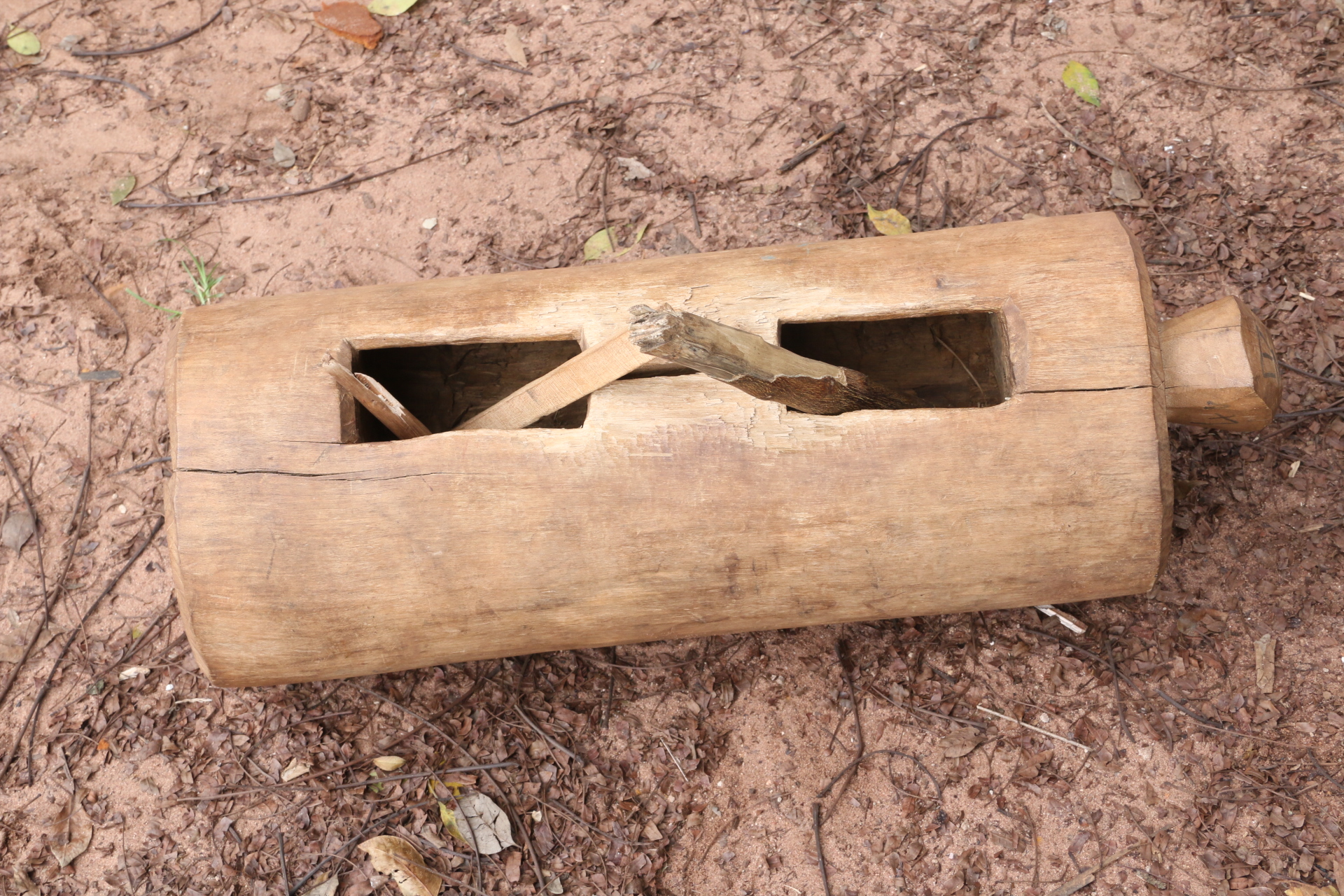
- Ekwe also known as Wooden Gong by AID Project

Percussion instrument
- Classification: Slit drum

Related instruments
- Drum

An Ekwe// is an Igbo traditional musical instrument. The ekwe is a slit drum with rectangular slits in the surface and a hollow interior. The ekwe is made out of wood, most commonly a log or a section of one. The ekwe comes in a variety of sizes and designs; the size is determined according to the purpose. An ekwe can be used for traditional cultural events, or it can be used for music. The ekwe is also used as a type of talking drum communicating, in the past, with others at long distances. Ekwe players use different rhythms for different purposes, from celebrations to emergencies.
